A comprehensive listing of all the bird species confirmed in the United States follows. It includes species from all 50 states and the District of Columbia as of July 2022. Species confirmed in other U.S. territories are also included with other "as of" dates.

The birds of the continental United States most closely resemble those of Eurasia, which was connected to the continent as part of the supercontinent Laurasia until around 60 million years ago. Many groups occur throughout the Northern Hemisphere and worldwide. However some groups unique to the New World have also arisen; those represented in the list are the hummingbirds, the New World vultures, the New World quail, the tyrant flycatchers, the vireos, the mimids, the New World warblers, the tanagers, the cardinals, and the icterids.

Several common birds in the United States, such as the house sparrow, the rock pigeon, the European starling, and the mute swan are introduced species, meaning that they are not native to North America, but were brought there by humans. Introduced species are marked as (I). In addition, many non-native species which have individual escapees or small feral populations in North America are not on the list. It is especially true of birds that are commonly held as pets, such as parrots and finches.

The status of one bird on the list, the ivory-billed woodpecker, is controversial. Until 2005, the bird was widely considered to be extinct. In April of that year, it was reported that at least one adult male bird had been sighted in the Cache River National Wildlife Refuge in Arkansas. The report, however, has not been universally accepted, and the American Birding Association still lists the ivory-billed woodpecker as extinct.

Hawaii has many endemic bird species (such as the Kauaʻi ʻelepaio) that are vulnerable or endangered, and some have become extinct. The number of birds on Guam has been severely reduced by introduced brown tree snakes — several endemic species on Guam (such as the Guam flycatcher) have become extinct, while others (such as the Guam rail) have become extinct in the wild. Guam rails have since been reintroduced to the wild on Guam and Rota. There are many endemic bird species in Puerto Rico and the Northern Mariana Islands, while American Samoa has South Pacific bird species (such as the many-colored fruit dove) found in no other part of the United States.

Sources and geographic coverage

The majority of this list is derived from the Check-list of North and Middle American Birds, 7th edition through the 63rd Supplement, published by the American Ornithological Society (AOS) and the Bird Checklists of the World (Avibase). The geographic territory of that source which applies to the article is the 48 contiguous states, the District of Columbia, Alaska, Hawaii, the adjacent islands under the jurisdiction of those states, Puerto Rico, and the American Virgin Islands.

The article also includes birds found in the other U.S. territories (American Samoa, Guam, the Northern Mariana Islands, and the U.S. Minor Outlying Islands). In total, the list of birds in the article includes bird species found in the 50 states, the District of Columbia, and all U.S. territories.

The source for birds in the U.S. territories is the Avibase website: Bird checklists of the world (American Samoa), Bird checklists of the world (Guam), Bird checklists of the world (Northern Mariana Islands), Bird checklists of the world (Puerto Rico), Bird checklists of the world (United States Virgin Islands), and Bird Checklists of the world (U.S. Minor Outlying Islands).

When a bird's presence in the U.S. only occurs within a U.S. territory such as Puerto Rico, the name of the territory is noted alongside the bird's name.

Taxonomy and status

For species found in the 50 states, Puerto Rico, and the U.S. Virgin Islands, the taxonomic treatment (designation and sequence of orders, families and species) and nomenclature (common and scientific names) used in the list are those of the AOS, the recognized scientific authority on the taxonomy and nomenclature of North and Middle American birds. However, the common names of families are from the Clements taxonomy because the AOS list does not include them. The AOS's Committee on Classification and Nomenclature, the body responsible for maintaining and updating the Check-list, "strongly and unanimously continues to endorse the biological species concept (BSC), in which species are considered to be genetically cohesive groups of populations that are reproductively isolated from other such groups". The sequence and names of families and species found in American Samoa, Guam, and the U.S. Minor Outlying Islands follow the Clements taxonomy because the AOS does not address those areas.

Unless otherwise noted, the species listed here are considered to occur regularly in the United States as permanent residents, summer or winter residents or visitors, or annual migrants. The following tags are used to designate some species:

(A) Accidental - occurrence based on one or two (rarely more) records and unlikely to occur regularly
(C) Casual - occurrence based on two or a few records, with subsequent records not improbable
(E) Extinct - a species which no longer exists
(Ex) Extirpated - a species which no longer occurs in the United States, but other populations still exist elsewhere
(I) Introduced - a species established solely as result of direct or indirect human intervention; synonymous with non-native and non-indigenous
(EH) Endemic to Hawaii - a native species found only in Hawaii
(EG) Endemic to Guam - a native species found only in Guam
(ENM) Endemic to the Northern Mariana Islands - a native species found only in the Northern Mariana Islands
(EP) Endemic to Puerto Rico - a native species found only in Puerto Rico
(EU) Endemic to the U.S. Minor Outlying Islands - a native species found only in the U.S. Minor Outlying Islands
(EM) Endemic to the mainland - a native species found only in the 48 contiguous states, Alaska, and their adjacent islands

The (A) and (C) tags correspond to the codes 5 and 4 respectively of the American Birding Association. The (E), (Ex), and (I) tags describe species' status according to the AOS. The (EH) tags follow the AOS list and the (EM) tags are based on the Clements taxonomy.

Population status symbols are those of the Red List published by the International Union for Conservation of Nature (IUCN). The symbols apply to the species' worldwide status, not their status solely in the United States except for endemic species. The symbols and their meanings, in increasing order of peril, are:

 = least concern
 = near threatened
 = vulnerable
 = endangered
 = critically endangered
 = extinct in the wild
 = extinct

By the numbers

This list contains 1125 species found in the 50 states and the District of Columbia. Of these 1125, 155 are tagged as accidental, 101 as casual, and 55 as introduced. Thirty-three are known to be extinct and one, the thick-billed parrot, has been extirpated though a population remains in Mexico. Thirty-three living species are endemic to Hawaii; an additional 28 former Hawaiian endemics are known to be extinct and a few others are thought to be. Sixteen species are endemic to the 48 contiguous states and one to Alaska.

There are an additional 146 species whose presence in the United States is only within one or more U.S. territories; some of those species have become extinct. The total number of bird species on the list is 1267 (i.e. the 1120 bird species found in the 50 states and District of Columbia, plus the 146 species found only in the U.S. territories). Some of the species found in the 50 states and District of Columbia are also found in the U.S. territories.

Ducks, geese, and waterfowl

Order: AnseriformesFamily: Anatidae

Anatidae includes the ducks and most duck-like waterfowl, such as geese and swans. These birds are adapted to an aquatic existence with webbed feet, bills which are flattened to a greater or lesser extent, and feathers that are excellent at shedding water due to special oils.

White-faced whistling-duck, Dendrocygna viduata (U.S. Virgin Islands) (A) 
Black-bellied whistling-duck, Dendrocygna autumnalis 
West Indian whistling-duck, Dendrocygna arborea (Puerto Rico, U.S. Virgin Islands) 
Fulvous whistling-duck, Dendrocygna bicolor 
Emperor goose, Anser canagica 
Snow goose, Anser caerulescens 
Ross's goose, Anser rossii 
Graylag goose, Anser anser (A) 
Greater white-fronted goose, Anser albifrons 
Lesser white-fronted goose, Anser erythropus (A) 
Taiga bean-goose, Anser fabalis 
Tundra bean-goose, Anser serrirostris 
Pink-footed goose, Anser brachyrhynchus (C) 
Brant, Branta bernicla 
Barnacle goose, Branta leucopsis (C) 
Cackling goose, Branta hutchinsii 
Canada goose, Branta canadensis 
Hawaiian goose, Branta sandvicensis (EH) 
Mute swan, Cygnus olor (I) 
Black swan, Cygnus atratus (I) 
Trumpeter swan, Cygnus buccinator 
Tundra swan, Cygnus columbianus 
Whooper swan, Cygnus cygnus 
Egyptian goose, Alopochen aegyptiaca (I) 
Common shelduck, Tadorna tadorna (C) 
Muscovy duck, Cairina moschata
Wood duck, Aix sponsa 
Baikal teal, Sibirionetta formosa (C) 
Garganey, Spatula querquedula (C) 
Blue-winged teal, Spatula discors 
Cinnamon teal, Spatula cyanoptera 
Northern shoveler, Spatula clypeata 
Gadwall, Mareca strepera 
Falcated duck, Mareca falcata (C) 
Eurasian wigeon, Mareca penelope 
American wigeon, Mareca americana 
Pacific black duck, Anas superciliosa (American Samoa) 
Laysan duck, Anas laysanensis (EH)  
Hawaiian duck, Anas wyvilliana (EH) 
Eastern spot-billed duck, Anas zonorhyncha (C) 
Mallard, Anas platyrhynchos 
Mexican duck, Anas diazi (not yet assessed by the IUCN)
American black duck, Anas rubripes 
Mottled duck, Anas fulvigula 
White-cheeked pintail, Anas bahamensis (C) 
Northern pintail, Anas acuta 
Green-winged teal, Anas crecca 
Canvasback, Aythya valisineria 
Redhead, Aythya americana 
Common pochard, Aythya ferina 
Ring-necked duck, Aythya collaris 
Tufted duck, Aythya fuligula (A) 
Greater scaup, Aythya marila 
Lesser scaup, Aythya affinis 
Steller's eider, Polysticta stelleri (A) 
Spectacled eider, Somateria fischeri (A) 
King eider, Somateria spectabilis 
Common eider, Somateria mollissima 
Harlequin duck, Histrionicus histrionicus 
Labrador duck, Camptorhynchus labradorius (E) 
Surf scoter, Melanitta perspicillata 
Velvet scoter, Melanitta fusca 
White-winged scoter, Melanitta deglandi 
Stejneger's scoter, Melanitta stejnegeri 
Common scoter, Melanitta nigra 
Black scoter, Melanitta americana 
Long-tailed duck, Clangula hyemalis 
Bufflehead, Bucephala albeola 
Common goldeneye, Bucephala clangula 
Barrow's goldeneye, Bucephala islandica 
Smew, Mergellus albellus (A) 
Hooded merganser, Lophodytes cucullatus 
Common merganser, Mergus merganser 
Red-breasted merganser, Mergus serrator 
Masked duck, Nomonyx dominicus 
Ruddy duck, Oxyura jamaicensis

Megapodes

Order: GalliformesFamily: Megapodiidae

The Megapodiidae are stocky, medium-large chicken-like birds with small heads and large feet. All but the malleefowl occupy jungle habitats and most have brown or black coloring.

Micronesian scrubfowl, Megapodius laperouse (Northern Mariana Islands; extirpated from Guam)

Guans, chachalacas, and curassows
Order: GalliformesFamily: Cracidae

The chachalacas, guans, and curassows are birds in the family Cracidae. These are large birds, similar in general appearance to turkeys. The guans and curassows live in trees, but the smaller chachalacas are found in more open scrubby habitats. They are generally dull-plumaged, but the curassows and some guans have colorful facial ornaments.

Plain chachalaca, Ortalis vetula

New World quail

Order: GalliformesFamily: Odontophoridae

The New World quails are small, plump terrestrial birds only distantly related to the quails of the Old World, but named for their similar appearance and habits.

Mountain quail, Oreortyx pictus 
Northern bobwhite, Colinus virginianus 
Crested bobwhite, Colinus cristatus (U.S. Virgin Islands) (Ex) (I) 
Scaled quail, Callipepla squamata 
California quail, Callipepla californica 
Gambel's quail, Callipepla gambelii 
Montezuma quail, Cyrtonyx montezumae

Pheasants, grouse, and allies

Order: GalliformesFamily: Phasianidae

Phasianidae consists of the pheasants and their allies. These are terrestrial species, variable in size but generally plump with broad relatively short wings. Many species are gamebirds or have been domesticated as a food source for humans.

Wild turkey, Meleagris gallopavo 
Ruffed grouse, Bonasa umbellus 
Spruce grouse, Canachites canadensis 
Willow ptarmigan, Lagopus lagopus 
Rock ptarmigan, Lagopus muta 
White-tailed ptarmigan, Lagopus leucura 
Greater sage-grouse, Centrocercus urophasianus 
Gunnison sage-grouse, Centrocercus minimus (EM)  
Dusky grouse, Dendragapus obscurus 
Sooty grouse, Dendragapus fuliginosus 
Sharp-tailed grouse, Tympanuchus phasianellus 
Greater prairie-chicken, Tympanuchus cupido (EM)  
Lesser prairie-chicken, Tympanuchus pallidicinctus (EM)  
Gray partridge, Perdix perdix (I) 
Ring-necked pheasant, Phasianus colchicus (I) 
Kalij pheasant, Lophura leucomelanos (I) 
Indian peafowl, Pavo cristatus (I) 
Gray francolin, Ortygornis pondicerianus (I) 
Black francolin, Francolinus francolinus (I)  
Red junglefowl, Gallus gallus (I) (All U.S. territories — AS, GU, MP, PR, VI, UM) 
Himalayan snowcock, Tetraogallus himalayensis (I)  
Chukar, Alectoris chukar (I) 
Erckel's francolin, Pternistis erckelii (I) 
Blue-breasted quail, Synoicus chinensis (Guam) (I) 
Japanese quail, Coturnix japonica (I)

Flamingos

Order: PhoenicopteriformesFamily: Phoenicopteridae

Flamingos filter-feed on shellfish and algae. Their oddly shaped beaks are specially adapted to separate mud and silt from the food they consume and, uniquely, are used upside-down.

American flamingo, Phoenicopterus ruber

Grebes

Order: PodicipediformesFamily: Podicipedidae

Grebes are small to medium-large freshwater diving birds. They have lobed toes and are excellent swimmers and divers. However, they have their feet placed far back on the body, making them quite ungainly on land.

Least grebe, Tachybaptus dominicus 
Little grebe, Tachybaptus ruficollis (Northern Mariana Islands) (A) 
Pied-billed grebe, Podilymbus podiceps 
Horned grebe, Podiceps auritus 
Red-necked grebe, Podiceps grisegena 
Eared grebe, Podiceps nigricollis 
Western grebe, Aechmophorus occidentalis 
Clark's grebe, Aechmophorus clarkii

Sandgrouse
Order: PterocliformesFamily: Pteroclidae

Sandgrouse have small pigeon-like heads and necks, but sturdy compact bodies. They have long pointed wings and sometimes tails and a fast direct flight. Their legs are feathered down to the toes.

Chestnut-bellied sandgrouse, Pterocles exustus (I)

Pigeons and doves

Order: ColumbiformesFamily: Columbidae

Pigeons and doves are stout-bodied birds with short necks and short slender bills with a fleshy cere. They feed on seeds, fruit, and plants. Unlike most other birds, the doves and pigeons produce "crop milk," which is secreted by a sloughing of fluid-filled cells from the lining of the crop. Both sexes produce the highly nutritious substance to feed to the young.

Rock pigeon, Columba livia (I) 
Scaly-naped pigeon, Patagioenas squamosa (A) 
White-crowned pigeon, Patagioenas leucocephala 
Red-billed pigeon, Patagioenas flavirostris 
Plain pigeon, Patagioenas inornata (Puerto Rico) 
Band-tailed pigeon, Patagioenas fasciata 
European turtle-dove Streptopelia turtur (Single vagrant record in 2001) . 
Oriental turtle-dove, Streptopelia orientalis (C) 
Philippine collared-dove, Streptopelia dusumieri (Guam, Northern Mariana Islands) (I) 
Eurasian collared-dove, Streptopelia decaocto (I) 
African collared-dove, Streptopelia roseogrisea (Puerto Rico) (I) 
Spotted dove, Spilopelia chinensis (I) 
Shy ground-dove, Alopecoenas stairi (American Samoa) 
White-throated ground-dove, Alopecoenas xanthonurus (Guam, Northern Mariana Islands) 
Diamond dove, Geopelia cuneata (Puerto Rico) (I) 
Zebra dove, Geopelia striata (I) 
Passenger pigeon, Ectopistes migratorius (E) 
Inca dove, Columbina inca 
Common ground dove, Columbina passerina 
Ruddy ground dove, Columbina talpacoti 
Ruddy quail-dove, Geotrygon montana (A) 
Key West quail-dove, Geotrygon chrysia (C) 
Bridled quail-dove, Geotrygon mystacea (Puerto Rico, U.S. Virgin Islands) (A) 
White-tipped dove, Leptotila verreauxi 
White-winged dove, Zenaida asiatica 
Zenaida dove, Zenaida aurita (A) 
Mourning dove, Zenaida macroura 
Many-colored fruit-dove, Ptilinopus perousii (American Samoa) 
Crimson-crowned fruit-dove, Ptilinopus porphyraceus (American Samoa) 
Mariana fruit-dove, Ptilinopus roseicapilla (Northern Mariana Islands; extirpated from Guam) (ENM) 
Pacific imperial-pigeon, Ducula pacifica (American Samoa)

Cuckoos

Order: CuculiformesFamily: Cuculidae

The family Cuculidae includes cuckoos, roadrunners, and anis. These birds are of variable size with slender bodies, long tails, and strong legs.

Greater ani, Crotophaga major (U.S. Virgin Islands) (A) 
Smooth-billed ani, Crotophaga ani 
Groove-billed ani, Crotophaga sulcirostris 
Greater roadrunner, Geococcyx californianus 
Common cuckoo, Cuculus canorus 
Oriental cuckoo, Cuculus optatus (C) 
Chestnut-winged cuckoo, Clamator coromandus (Guam) (A) 
Dark-billed cuckoo, Coccyzus melacoryphus (A) 
Yellow-billed cuckoo, Coccyzus americanus 
Mangrove cuckoo, Coccyzus minor 
Black-billed cuckoo, Coccyzus erythropthalmus 
Puerto Rican lizard-cuckoo, Coccyzus vielloti (Puerto Rico) (EP) 
Long-tailed koel, Urodynamis tailtensis (American Samoa, U.S. Minor Outlying Islands)

Nightjars and allies

Order: CaprimulgiformesFamily: Caprimulgidae

Nightjars are medium-sized nocturnal birds that usually nest on the ground. They have long wings, short legs, and very short bills. Most have small feet, of little use for walking, and long pointed wings. Their soft plumage is cryptically colored to resemble bark or leaves.

Lesser nighthawk, Chordeiles acutipennis 
Common nighthawk, Chordeiles minor 
Antillean nighthawk,  Chordeiles gundlachii 
Common pauraque,  Nyctidromus albicollis 
Common poorwill, Phalaenoptilus nuttallii 
Chuck-will's-widow, Antrostomus carolinensis 
Buff-collared nightjar, Antrostomus ridgwayi 
Eastern whip-poor-will, Antrostomus vociferus 
Mexican whip-poor-will, Antrostomus arizonae 
Puerto Rican nightjar, Antrostomus noctitherus (Puerto Rico) (EP) 
White-tailed nightjar, Hydropsalis cayennensis (Puerto Rico) (A) 
Gray nightjar, Caprimulgus jotaka (A)

Potoos
Order: CaprimulgiformesFamily: Nyctibiidae

Potoos are a group of large near passerine birds related to the nightjars and frogmouths. These are nocturnal insectivores which lack the bristles around the mouth found in the true nightjars.

Northern potoo, Nyctibius jamaicensis (Puerto Rico) (A)

Swifts

Order: ApodiformesFamily: Apodidae

The swifts are small birds which spend the majority of their lives flying. These birds have very short legs and never settle voluntarily on the ground, perching instead only on vertical surfaces. Many swifts have long swept-back wings which resemble a crescent or boomerang.

Black swift, Cypseloides niger 
White-collared swift, Streptoprocne zonaris (C) 
Chimney swift, Chaetura pelagica 
Vaux's swift, Chaetura vauxi 
Short-tailed swift, Chaetura brachyura (U.S. Virgin Islands) 
White-throated needletail Hirundapus caudacutus (A) 
White-rumped swiftlet, Aerodramus spodiopygius (American Samoa)  
Uniform swiftlet, Aerodramus vanikorensis (Guam) 
Mariana swiftlet, Aerodramus bartschi (I)  
Caroline Islands swiftlet, Aerodramus inquietus (Guam, Northern Mariana Islands) 
Common swift, Apus apus (A) 
Fork-tailed swift, Apus pacificus (A) 
Alpine swift, Apus melba (Puerto Rico) (A) 
White-throated swift, Aeronautes saxatalis 
Antillean palm-swift, Tachornis phoenicobia (A)

Hummingbirds

Order: ApodiformesFamily: Trochilidae

Hummingbirds are small birds capable of hovering in mid-air due to the rapid flapping of their wings. They are the only birds that can fly backwards.

Mexican violetear, Colibri thalassinus 
Green-breasted mango, Anthracothorax prevostii (C) 
Puerto Rican mango, Anthracothorax aurulentus (Puerto Rico, U.S. Virgin Islands) 
Green mango, Anthracothorax viridis (Puerto Rico) (EP) 
Purple-throated carib, Eulampis jugularis (Puerto Rico, U.S. Virgin Islands) (A) 
Green-throated carib, Eulampis holosericeus (Puerto Rico, U.S. Virgin Islands) 
Rivoli's hummingbird, Eugenes fulgens (Not yet assessed by the IUCN)
Plain-capped starthroat, Heliomaster constantii (C) 
Amethyst-throated mountain-gem, Lampornis amethystinus (A) 
Blue-throated mountain-gem, Lampornis clemenciae 
Bahama woodstar, Calliphlox evelynae (A) 
Lucifer hummingbird, Calothorax lucifer 
Ruby-throated hummingbird, Archilochus colubris 
Black-chinned hummingbird, Archilochus alexandri 
Vervain hummingbird, Mellisuga minima (Puerto Rico) (A) 
Anna's hummingbird, Calypte anna 
Costa's hummingbird, Calypte costae 
Calliope hummingbird, Selasphorus calliope 
Rufous hummingbird, Selasphorus rufus 
Allen's hummingbird, Selasphorus sasin 
Broad-tailed hummingbird, Selasphorus platycercus 
Bumblebee hummingbird, Selasphorus heloisa (A) 
Puerto Rican emerald, Riccordia maugeaus (Puerto Rico) (EP) 
Broad-billed hummingbird, Cynanthus latirostris 
White-eared Hummingbird, Basilinna leucotis 
Xantus's hummingbird, Basilinna xantusii (A) 
Antillean crested hummingbird, Orthorhyncus cristatus (Puerto Rico, U.S. Virgin Islands) 
Violet-crowned hummingbird, Ramosomyia violiceps 
Berylline hummingbird, Amazilia beryllina 
Cinnamon hummingbird, Amazilia rutila (A) 
Buff-bellied hummingbird, Amazilia yucatanensis

Rails, gallinules, and coots

Order: GruiformesFamily: Rallidae

Rallidae is a large family of small to medium-sized birds which includes the rails, crakes, coots, and gallinules. The most typical family members occupy dense vegetation in damp environments near lakes, swamps, or rivers. In general they are shy and secretive birds, making them difficult to observe. Most species have strong legs and long toes which are well adapted to soft uneven surfaces. They tend to have short, rounded wings and to be weak fliers.

Paint-billed crake, Neocrex erythrops (A) 
Spotted rail, Pardirallus maculatus (A) 
Rufous-necked wood-rail, Aramides axillaris (A) 
Ridgway's rail, Rallus obsoletus 
Clapper rail, Rallus crepitans 
King rail, Rallus elegans 
Virginia rail, Rallus limicola 
Corn crake, Crex crex (C) 
Sora, Porzana carolina 
Common gallinule, Gallinula galeata 
Eurasian moorhen, Gallinula chloropus (Guam, Northern Mariana Islands) 
Eurasian coot, Fulica atra (A) 
Hawaiian coot, Fulica alai (EH) 
American coot, Fulica americana 
Purple gallinule, Porphyrio martinicus 
Purple swamphen, Porphyrio porphyrio (I) 
Black-backed swamphen, Porphyrio indicus (American Samoa) (Not yet assessed by the IUCN)
Australasian swamphen, Porphyrio melanotus (American Samoa) (Not yet assessed by the IUCN)
White-browed crake, Poliolimnas cinereus (formerly Guam) (Ex) 
Yellow rail, Coturnicops noveboracensis 
Yellow-breasted crake, Hapalocrex flaviventer (Puerto Rico) 
Black rail, Laterallus jamaicensis 
Buff-banded rail, Gallirallus philippensis (American Samoa) 
Guam rail, Gallirallus owstoni (Guam, Northern Mariana Islands) (EG / ENM) 
Wake Island rail, Gallirallus wakensis (U.S. Minor Outlying Islands — Wake Island) (EU) (E) 
Laysan rail, Zapornia palmeri (EH) (E) 
Hawaiian rail, Zapornia sandwichensis (EH) (E) 
Spotless crake, Zapornia tabuensis (American Samoa)

Finfoots
Order: GruiformesFamily: Heliornithidae

Finfoots resemble rails; they have long necks, slender bodies, broad tails, and sharp, pointed bills. Their legs and feet are brightly colored. The family has three species and only the sungrebe is found in the New World.

Sungrebe, Heliornis fulica (A)

Limpkin

Order: GruiformesFamily: Aramidae

The limpkin is an odd bird that looks like a large rail, but is skeletally closer to the cranes. It is found in marshes with some trees or scrub in the Caribbean, South America, and southern Florida.

Limpkin, Aramus guarauna

Cranes

Order: GruiformesFamily: Gruidae

Cranes are large, long-legged, and long-necked birds. Unlike the similar-looking but unrelated herons, cranes fly with necks outstretched, not pulled back. Most have elaborate and noisy courting displays or "dances".

Sandhill crane, Antigone canadensis 
Common crane, Grus grus (C) 
Whooping crane, Grus americana 
Hooded crane, Grus monacha (A)

Thick-knees
Order: CharadriiformesFamily: Burhinidae

The thick-knees are a group of waders found worldwide within the tropical zone, with some species also breeding in temperate Europe and Australia. They are medium to large waders with strong black or yellow-black bills, large yellow eyes, and cryptic plumage. Despite being classed as waders, most species have a preference for arid or semi-arid habitats.

Double-striped thick-knee, Burhinus bistriatus (A)

Stilts and avocets

Order: CharadriiformesFamily: Recurvirostridae

Recurvirostridae is a family of large wading birds which includes the avocets and stilts. The avocets have long legs and long up-curved bills. The stilts have extremely long legs and long, thin, straight bills.

Black-winged stilt, Himantopus himantopus  
Black-necked stilt, Himantopus mexicanus 
American avocet, Recurvirostra americana

Oystercatchers

Order: CharadriiformesFamily: Haematopodidae

The oystercatchers are large, obvious, and noisy plover-like birds, with strong bills used for smashing or prying open molluscs.

Eurasian oystercatcher, Haematopus ostralegus (A) 
American oystercatcher, Haematopus palliatus 
Black oystercatcher, Haematopus bachmani

Plovers and lapwings

Order: CharadriiformesFamily: Charadriidae

The family Charadriidae includes the plovers, dotterels, and lapwings. They are small to medium-sized birds with compact bodies, short thick necks, and long, usually pointed, wings. They are found in open country worldwide, mostly in habitats near water.

Northern lapwing, Vanellus vanellus (C) 
Masked lapwing, Vanellus miles (American Samoa) (A) 
Black-bellied plover, Pluvialis squatarola 
European golden-plover, Pluvialis apricaria (C) 
American golden-plover, Pluvialis dominica 
Pacific golden-plover, Pluvialis fulva 
Eurasian dotterel, Charadrius morinellus (C) 
Killdeer, Charadrius vociferus 
Common ringed plover, Charadrius hiaticula 
Semipalmated plover, Charadrius semipalmatus 
Piping plover, Charadrius melodus 
Little ringed plover, Charadrius dubius (A) 
Lesser sand-plover, Charadrius mongolus 
Greater sand-plover, Charadrius leschenaultii (A) 
Wilson's plover, Charadrius wilsonia 
Collared plover, Charadrius collaris (A) 
Kentish plover, Charadrius alexandrinus (Guam, Northern Mariana Islands) 
Snowy plover, Charadrius nivosus 
Mountain plover, Charadrius montanus

Jacanas
Order: CharadriiformesFamily: Jacanidae

The jacanas are a family of waders found worldwide within the tropical zone. They are identifiable by their huge feet and claws which enable them to walk on floating vegetation in the shallow lakes that are their preferred habitat.

Pheasant-tailed jacana, Hydrophasianus chirurgus (Northern Mariana Islands) (A) 
Northern jacana, Jacana spinosa (C)

Sandpipers and allies

Order: CharadriiformesFamily: Scolopacidae

Scolopacidae is a large diverse family of small to medium-sized shorebirds including the sandpipers, curlews, godwits, shanks, tattlers, woodcocks, snipes, dowitchers, and phalaropes. The majority of these species eat small invertebrates picked out of the mud or soil. Different lengths of legs and bills enable multiple species to feed in the same habitat, particularly on the coast, without direct competition for food.

Upland sandpiper, Bartramia longicauda 
Bristle-thighed curlew, Numenius tahitiensis 
Whimbrel, Numenius phaeopus 
Little curlew, Numenius minutus (A) 
Eskimo curlew, Numenius borealis (Possibly extinct) 
Long-billed curlew, Numenius americanus 
Far Eastern curlew, Numenius madagascariensis (C) 
Slender-billed curlew, Numenius tenuirostris (A) 
Eurasian curlew, Numenius arquata (C) 
Bar-tailed godwit, Limosa lapponica 
Black-tailed godwit, Limosa limosa 
Hudsonian godwit, Limosa haemastica 
Marbled godwit, Limosa fedoa 
Ruddy turnstone, Arenaria interpres 
Black turnstone, Arenaria melanocephala 
Great knot, Calidris tenuirostris (C) 
Red knot, Calidris canutus 
Surfbird, Calidris virgata 
Ruff, Calidris pugnax 
Broad-billed sandpiper, Limicola falcinellus (C) 
Sharp-tailed sandpiper, Calidris acuminata 
Stilt sandpiper, Calidris himantopus 
Curlew sandpiper, Calidris ferruginea 
Temminck's stint, Calidris temminckii (A) 
Long-toed stint, Calidris subminuta  
Spoon-billed sandpiper, Calidris pygmaea (C) 
Red-necked stint, Calidris ruficollis 
Sanderling, Calidris alba 
Dunlin, Calidris alpina 
Rock sandpiper, Calidris ptilocnemis 
Purple sandpiper, Calidris maritima 
Baird's sandpiper, Calidris bairdii 
Little stint, Calidris minuta (C) 
Least sandpiper, Calidris minutilla 
White-rumped sandpiper, Calidris fuscicollis 
Buff-breasted sandpiper, Calidris subruficollis 
Pectoral sandpiper, Calidris melanotos 
Semipalmated sandpiper, Calidris pusilla 
Western sandpiper, Calidris mauri 
Short-billed dowitcher, Limnodromus griseus 
Long-billed dowitcher, Limnodromus scolopaceus 
Jack snipe, Lymnocryptes minimus (C) 
Eurasian woodcock, Scolopax rusticola (A) 
American woodcock, Scolopax minor 
Latham’s snipe, Gallinago hardwickii (Guam) (A) 
Solitary snipe, Gallinago solitaria (A) 
Pin-tailed snipe, Gallinago stenura (A) 
Common snipe, Gallinago gallinago 
Wilson's snipe, Gallinago delicata 
Swinhoe's snipe, Gallinago megala (Guam, Northern Mariana Islands) 
Terek sandpiper, Xenus cinereus 
Common sandpiper, Actitis hypoleucos 
Spotted sandpiper, Actitis macularius 
Green sandpiper, Tringa ochropus (C) 
Solitary sandpiper, Tringa solitaria 
Gray-tailed tattler, Tringa brevipes 
Wandering tattler, Tringa incana 
Lesser yellowlegs, Tringa flavipes 
Willet, Tringa semipalmata 
Spotted redshank, Tringa erythropus (C) 
Common greenshank, Tringa nebularia 
Greater yellowlegs, Tringa melanoleuca 
Common redshank, Tringa totanus (A) 
Wood sandpiper, Tringa glareola 
Marsh sandpiper, Tringa stagnatilis (A) 
Wilson's phalarope, Phalaropus tricolor 
Red-necked phalarope, Phalaropus lobatus 
Red phalarope, Phalaropus fulicarius

Pratincoles and coursers
Order: CharadriiformesFamily: Glareolidae

The pratincoles have short legs, very long pointed wings, and long forked tails. Their most unusual feature for birds classed as waders is that they typically hunt their insect prey on the wing like swallows, although they can also feed on the ground. Their short bills are an adaptation to aerial feeding. Their flight is fast and graceful like that of a swallow or a tern, with many twists and turns to pursue their prey.

Oriental pratincole, Glareola maldivarum (A)

Skuas and jaegers

Order: CharadriiformesFamily: Stercorariidae

Skuas are in general medium to large birds, typically with gray or brown plumage, often with white markings on the wings. They have longish bills with hooked tips and webbed feet with sharp claws. They look like large dark gulls, but have a fleshy cere above the upper mandible. They are strong, acrobatic fliers.

Great skua, Stercorarius skua 
South polar skua, Stercorarius maccormicki 
Pomarine jaeger, Stercorarius pomarinus 
Parasitic jaeger, Stercorarius parasiticus 
Long-tailed jaeger, Stercorarius longicaudus

Auks, murres, and puffins
Order: CharadriiformesFamily: Alcidae

Alcids are superficially similar to penguins due to their black-and-white colors, their upright posture, and some of their habits. However, they are only distantly related to the penguins and are able to fly. Auks live on the open sea, only deliberately coming ashore to nest.

Dovekie, Alle alle 
Common murre, Uria aalge 
Thick-billed murre, Uria lomvia 
Razorbill, Alca torda 
Great auk, Pinguinus impennis (E) 
Black guillemot, Cepphus grylle 
Pigeon guillemot, Cepphus columba 
Long-billed murrelet, Brachyramphus perdix (A) 
Marbled murrelet, Brachyramphus marmoratus 
Kittlitz's murrelet, Brachyramphus brevirostris (A) 
Scripps's murrelet, Synthliboramphus scrippsi 
Guadalupe murrelet, Synthliboramphus hypoleucus 
Craveri's murrelet, Synthliboramphus craveri 
Ancient murrelet, Synthliboramphus antiquus 
Japanese murrelet, Synthliboramphus wumizusume (U.S. Minor Outlying Islands) (A) 
Cassin's auklet, Ptychoramphus aleuticus 
Parakeet auklet, Aethia psittacula 
Least auklet, Aethia pusilla 
Whiskered auklet, Aethia pygmaea 
Crested auklet, Aethia cristatella 
Rhinoceros auklet, Cerorhinca monocerata 
Atlantic puffin, Fratercula arctica 
Horned puffin, Fratercula corniculata 
Tufted puffin, Fratercula cirrhata

Gulls, terns, and skimmers

Order: CharadriiformesFamily: Laridae

Laridae is a family of medium to large seabirds and includes gulls, terns, and skimmers. Gulls are typically gray or white, often with black markings on the head or wings. They have stout, longish bills and webbed feet. Terns are a group of generally medium to large seabirds typically with grey or white plumage, often with black markings on the head. Most terns hunt fish by diving but some pick insects off the surface of fresh water. Terns are generally long-lived birds, with several species known to live in excess of 30 years. Skimmers are a small family of tropical tern-like birds. They have an elongated lower mandible which they use to feed by flying low over the water surface and skimming the water for small fish.

Swallow-tailed gull, Creagrus furcatus (A) 
Black-legged kittiwake, Rissa tridactyla 
Red-legged kittiwake, Rissa brevirostris 
Ivory gull, Pagophila eburnea 
Sabine's gull, Xema sabini 
Bonaparte's gull, Chroicocephalus philadelphia 
Silver gull, Chroicocephalus novaehollandiae (U.S. Minor Outlying Islands) (A) 
Gray-hooded gull, Chroicocephalus cirrocephalus (A) 
Black-headed gull, Chroicocephalus ridibundus 
Little gull, Hydrocoloeus minutus 
Ross's gull, Rhodostethia rosea 
Laughing gull, Leucophaeus atricilla 
Franklin's gull, Leucophaeus pipixcan 
Pallas's gull, Ichthyaetus ichthyaetus  
Belcher's gull, Larus belcheri (A) 
Black-tailed gull, Larus crassirostris (C) 
Heermann's gull, Larus heermanni 
Common gull, Larus canus 
Short-billed gull, Larus brachyrhynchus 
Ring-billed gull, Larus delawarensis 
Western gull, Larus occidentalis 
Yellow-footed gull, Larus livens 
California gull, Larus californicus 
Herring gull, Larus argentatus 
Yellow-legged gull, Larus cachinnans (C) 
Iceland gull, Larus glaucoides 
Lesser black-backed gull, Larus fuscus 
Slaty-backed gull, Larus schistisagus 
Glaucous-winged gull, Larus glaucescens 
Glaucous gull, Larus hyperboreus 
Great black-backed gull, Larus marinus 
Kelp gull, Larus dominicanus (C) 
Brown noddy, Anous stolidus 
Black noddy, Anous minutus 
Blue-gray noddy, Anous ceruleus 
White tern, Gygis alba 
Sooty tern, Onychoprion fuscatus 
Gray-backed tern, Onychoprion lunatus (American Samoa, Northern Mariana Islands, U.S. Minor Outlying Islands) 
Bridled tern, Onychoprion anaethetus 
Aleutian tern, Onychoprion aleuticus 
Little tern, Sternula albifrons (C) 
Least tern, Sternula antillarum 
Large-billed tern, Phaetusa simplex (A) 
Gull-billed tern, Gelochelidon nilotica 
Caspian tern, Hydroprogne caspia 
Black tern, Chlidonias niger 
White-winged tern, Chlidonias leucopterus (C) 
Whiskered tern, Chlidonias hybrida (A) 
Roseate tern, Sterna dougallii 
Black-naped tern, Sterna sumatrana (American Samoa, Guam, Northern Mariana Islands) (A) 
Common tern, Sterna hirundo 
Arctic tern, Sterna paradisaea 
Forster's tern, Sterna forsteri 
Royal tern, Thalasseus maximus 
Great crested tern, Thalasseus bergii (A) 
Sandwich tern, Sterna sandvicensis (A) 
Elegant tern, Thalasseus elegans (A) 
Black skimmer, Rynchops niger (A)

Tropicbirds

Order: PhaethontiformesFamily: Phaethontidae

Tropicbirds are slender white birds of tropical oceans, with exceptionally long central tail feathers. Their long wings have black markings, as does the head.

White-tailed tropicbird, Phaethon lepturus 
Red-billed tropicbird, Phaethon aethereus 
Red-tailed tropicbird, Phaethon rubricauda

Loons

Order: GaviiformesFamily: Gaviidae

Loons are aquatic birds, the size of a large duck, to which they are unrelated. Their plumage is largely gray or black, and they have spear-shaped bills. Loons swim well and fly adequately, but are almost hopeless on land, because their legs are placed towards the rear of the body.

Red-throated loon, Gavia stellata 
Arctic loon, Gavia arctica 
Pacific loon, Gavia pacifica 
Common loon, Gavia immer 
Yellow-billed loon, Gavia adamsii

Albatrosses

Order: ProcellariiformesFamily: Diomedeidae

The albatrosses are among the largest of flying birds, and the great albatrosses of the genus Diomedea have the largest wingspans of any extant birds.

Yellow-nosed albatross, Thalassar chlororhynchus (C) 
White-capped albatross, Thalassarche cauta (C) 
Chatham albatross, Thalassarche eremita (A) 
Salvin's albatross, Thalassarche salvini (A) 
Black-browed albatross, Thalassarche melanophris (A) 
Light-mantled albatross, Phoebetria palpebrata (A) 
Wandering albatross, Diomedea exulans (A) 
Laysan albatross, Phoebastria immutabilis 
Black-footed albatross, Phoebastria nigripes 
Short-tailed albatross, Phoebastria albatrus

Southern storm-petrels

Order: ProcellariiformesFamily: Oceanitidae

The storm-petrels are the smallest seabirds, relatives of the petrels, feeding on planktonic crustaceans and small fish picked from the surface, typically while hovering. The flight is fluttering and sometimes bat-like. Until 2018, these species were included with the other storm-petrels in family Hydrobatidae.

Wilson's storm-petrel, Oceanites oceanicus 
White-faced storm-petrel, Pelagodroma marina 
Black-bellied storm-petrel, Fregetta tropica(A) 
Polynesian storm-petrel, Nesofregetta fuliginosa (American Samoa)

Northern storm-petrels
Order: ProcellariiformesFamily: Hydrobatidae

Though the members of the family are similar in many respects to the southern storm-petrels, including their general appearance and habits, there are enough genetic differences to warrant their placement in a separate family.

European storm-petrel, Hydrobates pelagicus (C) 
Fork-tailed storm-petrel, Hydrobates furcatus 
Ringed storm-petrel, Hydrobates hornbyi (A) 
Swinhoe's storm-petrel, Hydrobates monorhis (A) 
Leach's storm-petrel, Hydrobates leucorhous 
Townsend's storm-petrel, Hydrobates socorroensis 
Ashy storm-petrel, Hydrobates homochroa 
Band-rumped storm-petrel, Hydrobates castro 
Wedge-rumped storm-petrel, Hydrobates tethys (C) 
Black storm-petrel, Hydrobates melania 
Tristram's storm-petrel, Hydrobates tristrami 
Least storm-petrel, Hydrobates microsoma 
Matsudaira's storm-petrel, Oceanodroma matsudairae (Guam, Northern Mariana Islands)

Shearwaters and petrels

Order: ProcellariiformesFamily: Procellariidae

The procellariids are the main group of medium-sized "true petrels", characterized by united nostrils with medium septum and a long outer functional primary.

Northern giant petrel, Macronectes halli (A) 
Northern fulmar, Fulmarus glacialis 
Gray-faced petrel, Pterodroma gouldi (A) 
Providence petrel, Pterodroma solandri (C) 
Kermadec petrel, Pterodroma neglecta (C) 
Trindade petrel, Pterodroma arminjoniana 
Herald petrel, Pterodroma heraldica (C) 
Murphy's petrel, Pterodroma ultima 
Mottled petrel, Pterodroma inexpectata 
Bermuda petrel, Pterodroma cahow 
Black-capped petrel, Pterodroma hasitata 
Juan Fernandez petrel, Pterodroma externa 
Hawaiian petrel, Pterodroma sandwichensis 
White-necked petrel, Pterodroma cervicalis 
Bonin petrel, Pterodroma hypoleuca 
Black-winged petrel, Pterodroma nigripennis 
Fea's petrel, Pterodroma feae 
Zino's petrel, Pterodroma madeira (A) 
Cook's petrel, Pterodroma cookii 
Gould's petrel, Pterodroma leucoptera (American Samoa) 
Collared petrel, Pterodroma brevipes (American Samoa) 
Stejneger's petrel, Pterodroma longirostris (C) 
Phoenix petrel, Pterodroma alba (American Samoa, U.S. Minor Outlying Islands) 
Tahiti petrel, Pseudobulweria rostrata (A) 
Bulwer's petrel, Bulweria bulwerii 
Jouanin's petrel, Bulweria fallax (A) 
White-chinned petrel, Procellaria aequinoctialis (A) 
Parkinson's petrel, Procellaria parkinsoni (A) 
Streaked shearwater, Calonectris leucomelas (C) 
Cory's shearwater, Calonectris diomedea 
Cape Verde shearwater, Calonectris edwardsii (A) 
Wedge-tailed shearwater, Ardenna pacifica 
Buller's shearwater, Ardenna bulleri 
Short-tailed shearwater, Ardenna tenuirostris 
Sooty shearwater, Ardenna grisea 
Great shearwater, Ardenna gravis 
Pink-footed shearwater, Ardenna creatopus 
Flesh-footed shearwater, Ardenna carneipes 
Christmas shearwater, Puffinus nativitatis 
Manx shearwater, Puffinus puffinus 
Townsend's shearwater, Puffinus auricularis 
Newell's shearwater, Puffinus newelli 
Bryan's shearwater, Puffinus bryani (A) 
Black-vented shearwater, Puffinus opisthomelas 
Little shearwater, Puffinus assimilis (U.S. Minor Outlying Islands) 
Audubon's shearwater, Puffinus lherminieri 
Tropical shearwater, Puffinus bailloni (American Samoa, Guam, Northern Mariana Islands, U.S. Minor Outlying Islands) 
Barolo shearwater, Puffinus baroli (A) (Not yet assessed by the IUCN)

Storks

Order: CiconiiformesFamily: Ciconiidae

Storks are large, heavy, long-legged, long-necked wading birds with long stout bills and wide wingspans. They lack the powder down that other wading birds such as herons, spoonbills, and ibises use to clean off fish slime. Storks lack a pharynx and are mute.

Jabiru, Jabiru mycteria (C) 
Wood stork, Mycteria americana

Frigatebirds

Order: SuliformesFamily: Fregatidae

Frigatebirds are large seabirds usually found over tropical oceans. They are large, black, or black-and-white, with long wings and deeply forked tails. The males have colored inflatable throat pouches. They do not swim or walk and cannot take off from a flat surface. Having the largest wingspan-to-body-weight ratio of any bird, they are essentially aerial, able to stay aloft for more than a week.

Lesser frigatebird, Fregata ariel (C) 
Magnificent frigatebird, Fregata magnificens 
Great frigatebird, Fregata minor

Boobies and gannets

Order: SuliformesFamily: Sulidae

The sulids comprise the gannets and boobies. Both groups are medium-large coastal seabirds that plunge-dive for fish.

Masked booby, Sula dactylatra 
Nazca booby, Sula granti (C) 
Blue-footed booby, Sula nebouxii (C) 
Brown booby, Sula leucogaster 
Red-footed booby, Sula sula 
Abbott's booby, Papasula abbotti (Northern Mariana Islands) (A) 
Northern gannet, Morus bassanus

Anhingas

Order: SuliformesFamily: Anhingidae

Anhingas are cormorant-like water birds with very long necks and long straight beaks. They are fish eaters which often swim with only their neck above the water.

Anhinga, Anhinga anhinga

Cormorants and shags

Order: SuliformesFamily: Phalacrocoracidae

Cormorants are medium-to-large aquatic birds, usually with mainly dark plumage and areas of colored skin on the face. The bill is long, thin, and sharply hooked. Their feet are four-toed and webbed.

Little pied cormorant, Microcarbo melanoleucos (Northern Mariana Islands) (A) 
Brandt's cormorant, Urile penicillatus 
Red-faced cormorant, Urile urile 
Pelagic cormorant, Urile pelagicus 
Great cormorant, Phalacrocorax carbo 
Double-crested cormorant, Nannopterum auritum 
Neotropic cormorant, Nannopterum brasilianum

Pelicans

Order: PelecaniformesFamily: Pelecanidae

Pelicans are very large water birds with a distinctive pouch under their beak. Like other birds in the order Pelecaniformes, they have four webbed toes.

American white pelican, Pelecanus erythrorhynchos 
Brown pelican, Pelecanus occidentalis

Herons, egrets, and bitterns

Order: PelecaniformesFamily: Ardeidae

The family Ardeidae contains the herons, egrets, and bitterns. Herons and egrets are medium to large wading birds with long necks and legs. Bitterns tend to be shorter necked and more secretive. Members of Ardeidae fly with their necks retracted, unlike other long-necked birds such as storks, ibises, and spoonbills.

American bittern, Botaurus lentiginosus 
Yellow bittern, Ixobrychus sinensis (A) 
Cinnamon bittern, Ixobrychus cinnamomeus (Northern Mariana Islands) (A) 
Black bittern, Ixobrychus flavicollis (Guam) (A) 
Least bittern, Ixobrychus exilis 
Bare-throated tiger-heron, Tigrisoma mexicanum (A) 
Great blue heron, Ardea herodias 
Gray heron, Ardea cinerea (A) 
Great egret, Ardea alba 
Intermediate egret, Ardea intermedia (A) 
White-faced heron, Egretta novaehollandiae (American Samoa) (A) 
Chinese egret, Egretta eulophotes (A) 
Little egret, Egretta garzetta (C) 
Western reef-heron, Egretta gularis (A) 
Pacific reef-heron, Egretta sacra (American Samoa, Guam, Northern Mariana Islands) 
Snowy egret, Egretta thula 
Little blue heron, Egretta caerulea 
Tricolored heron, Egretta tricolor 
Reddish egret, Egretta rufescens 
Cattle egret, Bubulcus ibis 
Chinese pond-heron, Ardeola bacchus (A) 
Green heron, Butorides virescens 
Striated heron, Butorides striata (Puerto Rico) (A) 
Black-crowned night-heron, Nycticorax nycticorax 
Nankeen night-heron, Nycticorax caledonicus (Northern Mariana Islands) (A) 
Yellow-crowned night-heron, Nyctanassa violacea

Ibises and spoonbills

Order: PelecaniformesFamily: Threskiornithidae

The family Threskiornithidae includes the ibises and spoonbills. They have long, broad wings. Their bodies tend to be elongated, the neck more so, with rather long legs. The bill is also long, decurved in the case of the ibises, straight and distinctively flattened in the spoonbills.

White ibis, Eudocimus albus 
Scarlet ibis, Eudocimus ruber (A) 
Glossy ibis, Plegadis falcinellus 
White-faced ibis, Plegadis chihi 
Roseate spoonbill, Platalea ajaja 
African sacred ibis, Threskiornis aethiopicus (I)

New World vultures

Order: CathartiformesFamily: Cathartidae

The New World vultures are not closely related to Old World vultures, but superficially resemble them because of convergent evolution. Like the Old World vultures, they are scavengers. However, unlike Old World vultures, which find carcasses by sight, New World vultures have a good sense of smell with which they locate carcasses.

California condor, Gymnogyps californianus (Ex) 
Black vulture, Coragyps atratus 
Turkey vulture, Cathartes aura

Osprey
Order: AccipitriformesFamily: Pandionidae

Pandionidae is a monotypic family of fish-eating birds of prey.  Its single species possesses a very large and powerful hooked beak, strong legs, strong talons, and keen eyesight.

Osprey, Pandion haliaetus

Hawks, eagles, and kites

Order: AccipitriformesFamily: Accipitridae

Accipitridae is a family of birds of prey which includes hawks, eagles, kites, harriers, and Old World vultures. These birds have very large powerful hooked beaks for tearing flesh from their prey, strong legs, powerful talons, and keen eyesight.

White-tailed kite, Elanus leucurus 
Hook-billed kite, Chondrohierax uncinatus 
Swallow-tailed kite, Elanoides forficatus 
Golden eagle, Aquila chrysaetos 
Double-toothed kite, Harpagus bidentatus (A) 
Gray-faced buzzard, Butastur indicus (Guam) (A) 
Northern harrier, Circus hudsonius 
Western marsh-harrier, Circus aeruginosus (A) 
Eastern marsh harrier, Circus spilonotus (Northern Mariana Islands) (A) 
Hen harrier, Circus cyaneus (U.S. Minor Outlying Islands) (A) 
Chinese sparrowhawk, Accipiter soloensis (A) 
Sharp-shinned hawk, Accipiter striatus 
Cooper's hawk, Accipiter cooperii 
Northern goshawk, Accipiter gentilis 
Eurasian sparrowhawk, Accipiter nisus (A) 
Black kite, Milvus migrans (A) 
Bald eagle, Haliaeetus leucocephalus 
White-tailed eagle, Haliaeetus albicilla (C) 
Steller's sea-eagle, Haliaeetus pelagicus (C) 
Mississippi kite, Ictinia mississippiensis 
Crane hawk, Geranospiza caerulescens (A) 
Snail kite, Rostrhamus sociabilis 
Common black hawk, Buteogallus anthracinus 
Great black hawk, Buteogallus urubitinga (A)  
Roadside hawk, Rupornis magnirostris (C) 
Harris's hawk, Parabuteo unicinctus 
White-tailed hawk, Geranoaetus albicaudatus 
Gray hawk, Buteo plagiatus 
Red-shouldered hawk, Buteo lineatus 
Broad-winged hawk, Buteo platypterus 
Hawaiian hawk, Buteo solitarius (EH) 
Short-tailed hawk, Buteo brachyurus 
Swainson's hawk, Buteo swainsoni 
Zone-tailed hawk, Buteo albonotatus 
Red-tailed hawk, Buteo jamaicensis 
Rough-legged hawk, Buteo lagopus 
Ferruginous hawk, Buteo regalis 
Long-legged buzzard, Buteo rufinus (A) 
Common buzzard, Buteo buteo (Northern Mariana Islands) 
Eastern buzzard, Buteo japonicus (Northern Mariana Islands) (A)

Barn-owls
Order: StrigiformesFamily: Tytonidae

Owls in the family Tytonidae are medium to large owls with large heads and characteristic heart-shaped faces.

Barn owl, Tyto alba

Owls

Order: StrigiformesFamily: Strigidae

Typical or "true" owls are small to large solitary nocturnal birds of prey. They have large forward-facing eyes and ears, a hawk-like beak, and a conspicuous circle of feathers around each eye called a facial disk.

Oriental scops-owl, Otus sunia (A) 
Flammulated owl, Psiloscops flammeolus 
Puerto Rican owl, Gymnasio nudipes (Puerto Rico) (EP) 
Whiskered screech-owl, Megascops trichopsis 
Western screech-owl, Megascops kennicottii 
Eastern screech-owl, Megascops asio 
Great horned owl, Bubo virginianus 
Snowy owl, Bubo scandiacus 
Northern hawk owl, Surnia ulula 
Northern pygmy-owl, Glaucidium gnoma 
Ferruginous pygmy-owl, Glaucidium brasilianum 
Elf owl, Micrathene whitneyi 
Burrowing owl, Athene cunicularia 
Mottled owl, Strix virgata (A) 
Spotted owl, Strix occidentalis 
Barred owl, Strix varia 
Great gray owl, Strix nebulosa 
Long-eared owl, Asio otus 
Stygian owl, Asio stygius (A) 
Short-eared owl, Asio flammeus 
Boreal owl, Aegolius funereus 
Northern saw-whet owl, Aegolius acadicus 
Northern boobook, Ninox scutulata (A)

Trogons

Order: TrogoniformesFamily: Trogonidae

Trogons are residents of tropical forests worldwide with the greatest diversity in Central and South America. They feed on insects and fruit, and their broad bills and weak legs reflect their diet and arboreal habits. Although their flight is fast, they are reluctant to fly any distance. Trogons do not migrate. Trogons have soft, often colorful, feathers with distinctive male and female plumage. They nest in holes in trees or termite nests, laying white or pastel-colored eggs.

Elegant trogon, Trogon elegans 
Eared quetzal, Euptilotis neoxenus (C)

Hoopoes
Order: UpupiformesFamily: Upupidae

Hoopoes spend much time on the ground hunting insects and worms. This black, white, and pink bird is quite unmistakable, especially in its erratic flight, which is like that of a giant butterfly. The crest is erectile, but is mostly kept closed. It walks on the ground like a starling. The song is a trisyllabic oop-oop-oop, which gives rise to its English and scientific names.

Eurasian hoopoe, Upupa epops (A)

Todies
Order: CoraciiformesFamily: Todidae

Todies are a group of small near passerine forest species endemic to the Caribbean. These birds have colorful plumage and resembles kingfishers, but have flattened bills with serrated edges. They eat small prey such as insects and lizards.

Puerto Rican tody, Todus mexicanus (Puerto Rico) (EP)

Kingfishers

Order: CoraciiformesFamily: Alcedinidae

Kingfishers are medium-sized birds with large heads, long, pointed bills, short legs, and stubby tails.

Common kingfisher, Alcedo atthis (Guam) (A) 
Pacific kingfisher, Todiramphus sacer (American Samoa) 
Guam kingfisher, Todiramphus cinnamominus (Guam) (EG) 
Collared kingfisher, Todiramphus chloris (American Samoa) 
Mariana kingfisher, Todiramphus albicilla (Northern Mariana Islands) (ENM) 
Ringed kingfisher, Megaceryle torquata 
Belted kingfisher, Megaceryle alcyon 
Amazon kingfisher, Chloroceryle amazona (A) 
Green kingfisher, Chloroceryle americana

Rollers
Order: CoraciiformesFamily: Coraciidae

Rollers resemble crows in size and build, but are more closely related to the kingfishers and bee-eaters. They share the colorful appearance of those groups with blues and browns predominating. The two inner front toes are connected, but the outer toe is not.

Oriental dollarbird, Eurystomus orientalis (Guam, Northern Mariana Islands) (A)

Woodpeckers

Order: PiciformesFamily: Picidae

Woodpeckers are small to medium-sized birds with chisel-like beaks, short legs, stiff tails, and long tongues used for capturing insects. Some species have feet with two toes pointing forward and two backward, while several species have only three toes. Many woodpeckers have the habit of tapping noisily on tree trunks with their beaks.

Eurasian wryneck, Jynx torquilla (A) 
Lewis's woodpecker, Melanerpes lewis 
Puerto Rican woodpecker, Melanerpes portoricensis (Puerto Rico, extirpated from U.S. Virgin Islands) (EP) 
Red-headed woodpecker, Melanerpes erythrocephalus 
Acorn woodpecker, Melanerpes formicivorus 
Gila woodpecker, Melanerpes uropygialis 
Golden-fronted woodpecker, Melanerpes aurifrons 
Red-bellied woodpecker, Melanerpes carolinus 
Williamson's sapsucker, Sphyrapicus thyroideus 
Yellow-bellied sapsucker, Sphyrapicus varius 
Red-naped sapsucker, Sphyrapicus nuchalis 
Red-breasted sapsucker, Sphyrapicus ruber 
American three-toed woodpecker, Picoides dorsalis 
Black-backed woodpecker, Picoides arcticus 
Great spotted woodpecker, Dendrocopos major (C) 
Downy woodpecker, Dryobates pubescens 
Nuttall's woodpecker, Dryobates nuttallii 
Ladder-backed woodpecker, Dryobates scalaris 
Red-cockaded woodpecker, Dryobates borealis (EM) 
Hairy woodpecker, Dryobates villosus 
White-headed woodpecker, Dryobates albolarvatus 
Arizona woodpecker, Dryobates arizonae 
Northern flicker, Colaptes auratus 
Gilded flicker, Colaptes chrysoides 
Pileated woodpecker, Dryocopus pileatus 
Ivory-billed woodpecker, Campephilus principalis (E?)(Ex?)

Falcons and caracaras

Order: FalconiformesFamily: Falconidae

Falconidae is a family of diurnal birds of prey, notably the falcons and caracaras. They differ from hawks, eagles, and kites in that they kill with their beaks instead of their talons.

Collared forest-falcon, Micrastur semitorquatus (A) 
Crested caracara, Caracara plancus 
Eurasian kestrel, Falco tinnunculus (C) 
American kestrel, Falco sparverius 
Red-footed falcon, Falco vespertinus (A) 
Amur falcon, Falco amurensis (Northern Mariana Islands) (A) 
Merlin, Falco columbarius 
Eurasian hobby, Falco subbuteo (C) 
Aplomado falcon, Falco femoralis 
Gyrfalcon, Falco rusticolus 
Peregrine falcon, Falco peregrinus 
Prairie falcon, Falco mexicanus

Cockatoos

Order: PsittaciformesFamily: Cacatuidae

Cockatoos share many features with true parrots (family Psittacidae) including the characteristic curved beak shape and a zygodactyl foot, with two forward toes and two backwards toes. They differ, however in a number of characteristics, including the movable headcrest, and their lack of the Dyck texture feather composition, which gives many parrots their iridescent colors. Cockatoos are also, on average, larger than the true parrots.

Tanimbar corella, Cacatua goffiniana (Puerto Rico) (I) 
Sulphur-crested cockatoo, Cacatua galerita (Puerto Rico) (I) 
White cockatoo, Cacatua alba (Puerto Rico) (I)

New World and African parrots

Order: PsittaciformesFamily: Psittacidae

Characteristic features of parrots include a strong curved bill, an upright stance, strong legs, and clawed zygodactyl feet. Many parrots are vividly colored, and some are multi-colored. Most of the more than 150 species in this family are found in the New World.

Monk parakeet, Myiopsitta monachus (I) 
Carolina parakeet, Conuropsis carolinensis (E) 
Orange-fronted parakeet, Eupsittula canicularis (Puerto Rico) (I) 
Brown-throated parakeet, Eupsittula pertinax (Puerto Rico, U.S. Virgin Islands) (I)(Ex?) 
Nanday parakeet, Aratinga nenday (I) 
Green parakeet, Psittacara holochlorus 
Puerto Rican parakeet, Psittacara maugei (Puerto Rico) (EP) 
Hispaniolan parakeet, Psittacara choloropterus (Puerto Rico) (I) 
Mitred parakeet, Psittacara mitratus (I) 
Red-masked parakeet, Psittacara erythrogenys (Puerto Rico) (I) 
Thick-billed parrot, Rhynchopsitta pachyrhyncha (Ex) 
White-winged parakeet, Brotogeris versicolurus (I) 
Yellow-chevroned parakeet, Brotogeris chiriri (I) 
White-fronted parrot, Amazon albifrons (Puerto Rico) (I) 
Hispaniolan parrot, Amazona ventralis (Puerto Rico, U.S. Virgin Islands) (I) 
Puerto Rican parrot, Amazona vittata (Puerto Rico) (EP) 
Orange-winged parrot, Amazona amazonica (Puerto Rico) (I) 
Red-crowned parrot, Amazona viridigenalis (I) 
Yellow-headed parrot, Amazona oratrix (Puerto Rico) (I)

Old World parrots
Order: PsittaciformesFamily: Psittaculidae

Characteristic features of parrots include a strong curved bill, an upright stance, strong legs, and clawed zygodactyl feet. Many parrots are vividly colored, and some are multi-colored. Old World parrots are found from Africa east across south and southeast Asia and Oceania to Australia and New Zealand.

Rose-ringed parakeet, Psittacula krameri (I) 
Blue-crowned lorikeet, Vini australis (American Samoa) 
Rosy-faced lovebird, Agapornis roseicollis (I)

Tityras and allies
Order: PasseriformesFamily: Tityridae

Tityridae is family of suboscine passerine birds found in forest and woodland in the Neotropics. The approximately 30 species in this family were formerly lumped with the families Pipridae and Cotingidae (see Taxonomy). As yet, no widely accepted common name exists for the family, although Tityras and allies and Tityras, mourners, and allies have been used. They are small to medium-sized birds.

Masked tityra, Tityra semifasciata (A) 
Gray-collared becard, Pachyramphus major (A) 
Rose-throated becard, Pachyramphus aglaiae

Honeyeaters
Order: PasseriformesFamily: Meliphagidae

The honeyeaters are a large and diverse family of small to medium-sized birds most common in Australia and New Guinea. They are nectar feeders and closely resemble other nectar-feeding passerines.

Micronesian myzomela, Myzomela rubratra (Northern Mariana Islands; extirpated from Guam) 
Cardinal myzomela, Myzomela cardinalis (American Samoa, extirpated from Guam) 
Mao, Gymnomyza samoensis (American Samoa) (Ex) 
Eastern wattled-honeyeater, Foulehaio carunculatus (American Samoa)

Cuckooshrikes
Order: PasseriformesFamily: Campephagidae

The cuckooshrikes are small to medium-sized passerine birds. They are predominantly grayish with white and black, although some species are brightly colored.

Ashy minivet, Pericrocotus divaricatus (Northern Mariana Islands) (A)

Drongos
Order: PasseriformesFamily: Dicruridae

The drongos are mostly black or dark gray in color, sometimes with metallic tints. They have long forked tails, and some Asian species have elaborate tail decorations. They have short legs and sit very upright when perched, like a shrike. They flycatch or take prey from the ground.

Black drongo, Dicrurus macrocercus (Guam, Northern Mariana Islands) (I)

Fantails
Order: PasseriformesFamily: Rhipiduridae

The fantails are small insectivorous birds which are specialist aerial feeders.

Rufous fantail, Rhipidura rufifrons (Guam, Northern Mariana Islands) (Ex)

Tyrant flycatchers

Order: PasseriformesFamily: Tyrannidae

Tyrant flycatchers are Passerine birds which occur throughout North and South America. They superficially resemble the Old World flycatchers, but are more robust and have stronger bills. They do not have the sophisticated vocal capabilities of the songbirds. Most, but not all, are rather plain. As the name implies, most are insectivorous.

Northern beardless-tyrannulet, Camptostoma imberbe 
Greenish elaenia, Myiopagis viridicata (A) 
Small-billed elaenia, Elaenia parvirostris (A) 
Caribbean elaenia, Elaenia martinica (Puerto Rico, U.S. Virgin Islands) 
White-crested elaenia, Elaenia albiceps (A) 
Dusky-capped flycatcher, Myiarchus tuberculifer +
Ash-throated flycatcher, Myiarchus cinerascens 
Nutting's flycatcher, Myiarchus nuttingi 
Great crested flycatcher, Myiarchus crinitus 
Brown-crested flycatcher, Myiarchus tyrannulus 
La Sagra's flycatcher, Myiarchus sagrae 
Stolid flycatcher, Myiarchus stolidus (U.S. Virgin Islands) (A) 
Puerto Rican flycatcher, Myiarchus antillarum (Puerto Rico) (EP) 
Great kiskadee, Pitangus sulphuratus 
Social flycatcher, Myiozetetes similis (A) 
Sulphur-bellied flycatcher, Myiodynastes luteiventris 
Piratic flycatcher, Legatus leucophaius (C) 
Variegated flycatcher, Empidonomus varius (A) 
Crowned slaty flycatcher, Empidonomus aurantioatrocristatus (A) 
Tropical kingbird, Tyrannus melancholicus 
Couch's kingbird, Tyrannus couchii 
Cassin's kingbird, Tyrannus vociferans 
Thick-billed kingbird, Tyrannus crassirostris 
Western kingbird, Tyrannus verticalis 
Eastern kingbird, Tyrannus tyrannus 
Gray kingbird, Tyrannus dominicensis 
Loggerhead kingbird, Tyrannus caudifasciatus (A) 
Scissor-tailed flycatcher, Tyrannus forficatus 
Fork-tailed flycatcher, Tyrannus savana 
Tufted flycatcher, Mitrephanes phaeocercus (C) 
Olive-sided flycatcher, Contopus cooperi 
Greater pewee, Contopus pertinax 
Western wood-pewee, Contopus sordidulus 
Eastern wood-pewee, Contopus virens 
Cuban pewee, Contopus caribaeus (A) 
Hispaniolan pewee, Contopus hispaniolensis (Puerto Rico) (A) 
Lesser Antillean pewee, Contopus latirostris (Puerto Rico) 
Yellow-bellied flycatcher, Empidonax flaviventris 
Acadian flycatcher, Empidonax virescens 
Alder flycatcher, Empidonax alnorum 
Willow flycatcher, Empidonax traillii 
Least flycatcher, Empidonax minimus 
Hammond's flycatcher, Empidonax hammondii 
Gray flycatcher, Empidonax wrightii 
Dusky flycatcher, Empidonax oberholseri 
Pine flycatcher, Empidonax affinis (A) 
Pacific-slope flycatcher, Empidonax difficilis 
Cordilleran flycatcher, Empidonax occidentalis 
Black phoebe, Sayornis nigricans 
Eastern phoebe, Sayornis phoebe 
Say's phoebe, Sayornis saya 
Vermilion flycatcher, Pyrocephalus rubinus

Vireos, shrike-babblers, and erpornis

Order: PasseriformesFamily: Vireonidae

The vireos are a group of small to medium-sized passerine birds mostly restricted to the New World, though a few other species in the family are found in Asia. They are typically greenish in color and resemble wood-warblers apart from their heavier bills.

Black-capped vireo, Vireo atricapilla 
White-eyed vireo, Vireo griseus 
Thick-billed vireo, Vireo crassirostris (C) 
Cuban vireo, Vireo gundlachii (A) 
Puerto Rican vireo, Vireo latimeri (Puerto Rico) (EP) 
Bell's vireo, Vireo bellii 
Gray vireo, Vireo vicinior 
Hutton's vireo, Vireo huttoni 
Yellow-throated vireo, Vireo flavifrons 
Cassin's vireo, Vireo cassinii 
Blue-headed vireo, Vireo solitarius 
Plumbeous vireo, Vireo plumbeus 
Philadelphia vireo, Vireo philadelphicus 
Warbling vireo, Vireo gilvus 
Red-eyed vireo, Vireo olivaceus 
Yellow-green vireo, Vireo flavoviridis 
Black-whiskered vireo, Vireo altiloquus 
Yucatan vireo, Vireo magister (A)

Monarch flycatchers

Order: PasseriformesFamily: Monarchidae

The Monarchinae are a relatively recent grouping of a number of seemingly very different birds, mostly from the Southern Hemisphere, which are more closely related than they at first appear. Many of the approximately 140 species making up the family were previously assigned to other groups, largely on the basis of general morphology or behavior. With the new insights generated by the DNA-DNA hybridisation studies of Sibley and his co-workers toward the end of the 20th century, however, it became clear that these apparently unrelated birds were all descended from a common ancestor. The Monarchinae are small to medium-sized insectivorous passerines, many of which hunt by flycatching.

Five of the species listed below (three species endemic to Hawaii, one species found in American Samoa, and one species endemic to the Northern Mariana Islands) represent the group in the United States. One species, the Guam flycatcher, is extinct because of the introduced brown tree snake on Guam.

Kauai elepaio, Chasiempis sclateri (EH) 
Oahu elepaio, Chasiempis ibidis (EH) 
Hawaii elepaio, Chasiempis sandwichensis (EH) 
Fiji shrikebill, Clytorhynchus vitiensi (American Samoa) 
Tinian monarch, Monarcha takatsukasae (Northern Mariana Islands) (ENM) 
Guam flycatcher, Myiagra freycineti (Guam) (EG) (E)

Shrikes

Order: PasseriformesFamily: Laniidae

Shrikes are passerine birds known for their habit of catching other birds and small animals and impaling the uneaten portions of their bodies on thorns. A shrike's beak is hooked, like that of a typical bird of prey.

Brown shrike, Lanius cristatus (C) 
Red-backed shrike, Lanius collurio (A) 
Loggerhead shrike, Lanius ludovicianus 
Northern shrike, Lanius borealis

Crows, jays, and magpies

Order: PasseriformesFamily: Corvidae

The family Corvidae includes crows, ravens, jays, choughs, magpies, treepies, nutcrackers, and ground jays. Corvids are above average in size among the Passeriformes, and some of the larger species show high levels of intelligence. Since about 2012, nesting fish crows have increasingly been documented in Canada along the northwest shore of Lake Ontario, so the species will probably soon no longer be considered endemic to the lower 48 U.S. states.

Canada jay, Perisoreus canadensis 
Brown jay, Psilorhinus morio (C) 
Green jay, Cyanocorax yncas 
Pinyon jay, Gymnorhinus cyanocephalus 
Steller's jay, Cyanocitta stelleri 
Blue jay, Cyanocitta cristata 
Florida scrub-jay, Aphelocoma coerulescens (EM) 
Island scrub-jay, Aphelocoma insularis (EM) 
California scrub-jay, Aphelocoma californica (Not yet assessed by the IUCN)
Woodhouse's scrub-jay, Aphelocoma woodhouseii (Not yet assessed by the IUCN)
Mexican jay, Aphelocoma wollweberi 
Clark's nutcracker, Nucifraga columbiana 
Black-billed magpie, Pica hudsonia 
Yellow-billed magpie, Pica nuttalli (EM) 
Eurasian jackdaw, Corvus monedula (C) 
Mariana crow, Corvus kubaryi (Guam, Northern Mariana Islands) 
American crow, Corvus brachyrhynchos 
White-necked crow, Corvus leucognaphalus (U.S. Minor Outlying Islands, Puerto Rico) (Ex) 
Tamaulipas crow, Corvus imparatus 
Fish crow, Corvus ossifragus (EM) 
Hawaiian crow, Corvus hawaiiensis (EH) 
Chihuahuan raven, Corvus cryptoleucus (A) 
Common raven, Corvus corax

Penduline-tits

Order: PasseriformesFamily: Remizidae

The only member of this family in the New World, the verdin is one of the smallest passerines in North America. It is gray overall and adults have a bright yellow head and rufous "shoulder patch" (the lesser coverts). Verdins are insectivorous, continuously foraging among the desert trees and scrubs. They are usually solitary except when they pair up to construct their conspicuous nests.

Verdin, Auriparus flaviceps

Tits, chickadees, and titmice

Order: PasseriformesFamily: Paridae

The Paridae are mainly small stocky woodland species with short stout bills. Some have crests. They are adaptable birds, with a mixed diet including seeds and insects.

Carolina chickadee, Poecile carolinensis(EM) 
Black-capped chickadee, Poecile atricapillus 
Mountain chickadee, Poecile gambeli 
Mexican chickadee, Poecile sclateri 
Chestnut-backed chickadee, Poecile rufescens 
Boreal chickadee, Poecile hudsonicus 
Gray-headed chickadee, Poecile cinctus 
Bridled titmouse, Baeolophus wollweberi 
Oak titmouse, Baeolophus inornatus 
Juniper titmouse, Baeolophus ridgwayi 
Tufted titmouse, Baeolophus bicolor 
Black-crested titmouse, Baeolophus atricristatus

Larks

Order: PasseriformesFamily: Alaudidae

Larks are small terrestrial birds with often extravagant songs and display flights. Most larks are fairly dull in appearance. Their food is insects and seeds.

Eurasian skylark, Alauda arvensis (see note for occurrence) 
Horned lark, Eremophila alpestris

Reed warblers and allies

Order: PasseriformesFamily: Acrocephalidae

The members of this family are usually rather large for "warblers". Most are rather plain olivaceous brown above with much yellow to beige below. They are usually found in open woodland, reedbeds, or tall grass. The family occurs mostly in southern to western Eurasia and surroundings, but also ranges far into the Pacific, with some species in Africa.

icterine warbler, Hippolais icterina (A)
Thick-billed warbler, Arundinax aedon (A) 
Millerbird, Acrocephalus familiaris (EH) 
Sedge warbler, Acrocephalus schoenobaenus (A) 
Blyth's reed warbler, Acrocephalus dumetorum (A) 
Nightingale reed warbler, Acrocephalus luscinius (Guam) (EG) (E) 
Saipan reed warbler, Acrocephalus hiwae (Northern Mariana Islands) (ENM) 
Aguiguan reed warbler, Acrocephalus nijoi (Northern Mariana Islands) (ENM) (E) 
Pagan reed warbler, Acrocephalus yamashinae (Northern Mariana Islands) (ENM) (E)

Grassbirds and allies
Order: PasseriformesFamily: Locustellidae

Locustellidae are a family of small insectivorous songbirds found mainly in Eurasia, Africa, and the Australian region. They are smallish birds with tails that are usually long and pointed, and tend to be drab brownish or buffy all over.

Pallas's grasshopper warbler, Helopsaltes certhiola (A) 
Middendorff's grasshopper warbler, Helopsaltes ochotensis (C) 
Lanceolated warbler, Locustella lanceolata (A) 
River warbler, Locustella fluviatilis (A)

Swallows

Order: PasseriformesFamily: Hirundinidae

The family Hirundinidae is adapted to aerial feeding. They have a slender streamlined body, long pointed wings, and a short bill with a wide gape. The feet are adapted to perching rather than walking, and the front toes are partially joined at the base.

Bank swallow, Riparia riparia 
Tree swallow, Tachycineta bicolor 
Bahama swallow, Tachycineta cyaneoviridis (C) 
Violet-green swallow, Tachycineta thalassina 
Mangrove swallow, Tachycineta albilinea (A) 
Northern rough-winged swallow, Stelgidopteryx serripennis 
Brown-chested martin, Progne tapera (A) 
Purple martin, Progne subis 
Southern martin, Progne elegans (A) 
Gray-breasted martin, Progne chalybea (A) 
Cuban martin, Progne cryptoleuca (A) 
Caribbean martin, Progne dominicensis (Puerto Rico, U.S. Virgin Islands) 
Barn swallow, Hirundo rustica 
Common house-martin, Delichon urbica (C) 
Cliff swallow, Petrochelidon pyrrhonota 
Cave swallow, Petrochelidon fulva

Long-tailed tits

Order: PasseriformesFamily: Aegithalidae

The long-tailed tits are a family of small passerine birds with medium to long tails. They make woven bag nests in trees. Most eat a mixed diet which includes insects.

Bushtit, Psaltriparus minimus

Bush warblers and allies
Order: PasseriformesFamily: Scotocercidae

The members of this family are found throughout Africa, Asia, and Polynesia.

Japanese bush-warbler, Horornis diphone (I)

Leaf warblers
Order: PasseriformesFamily: Phylloscopidae

Leaf warblers are a family of small insectivorous birds found mostly in Eurasia and ranging into Wallacea and Africa. The Arctic warbler breeds east into Alaska. The species are of various sizes, often green-plumaged above and yellow below, or more subdued with grayish-green to grayish-brown colors.

Willow warbler, Phylloscopus trochilus (A) 
Common chiffchaff, Phylloscopus collybita (A) 
Wood warbler, Phylloscopus sibilatrix (A) 
Dusky warbler, Phylloscopus fuscatus (C) 
Pallas's leaf warbler, Phylloscopus proregulus (A) 
Yellow-browed warbler, Phylloscopus inornatus (C) 
Arctic warbler, Phylloscopus borealis 
Kamchatka leaf warbler, Phylloscopus examinandus (A)

Bulbuls
Order: PasseriformesFamily: Pycnonotidae

The bulbuls are a family of medium-sized passerine songbirds native to Africa and tropical Asia. These are noisy and gregarious birds with often beautiful striking songs.

Red-vented bulbul, Pycnonotus cafer (I) 
Red-whiskered bulbul Pycnonotus jocosus (I)

Sylviid warblers, parrotbills, and allies
Order: PasseriformesFamily: Sylviidae

The family Sylviidae is a group of small insectivorous passerine birds. They mainly occur as breeding species, as the common name implies, in Europe, Asia, and to a lesser extent Africa. Most are of generally undistinguished appearance, but many have distinctive songs.

Lesser whitethroat, Sylvia curruca (A) 
Wrentit, Chamaea fasciata

White-eyes, yuhinas, and allies
Order: PasseriformesFamily: Zosteropidae

The white-eyes are small passerine birds native to tropical and sub-tropical Africa, southern Asia, and Australasia. The birds of this group are mostly of undistinguished appearance, their plumage above being generally some dull color like greenish-olive, but some species have a white or bright yellow throat, breast, or lower parts, and several have buff flanks. But as indicated by their scientific name, derived from the Ancient Greek for girdle-eye, there is a conspicuous ring around the eyes of many species. They have rounded wings and strong legs. The size ranges up to 15 cm (6 inches) in length. All the species of white-eyes are sociable, forming large flocks which only separate on the approach of the breeding season. Though mainly insectivorous, they eat nectar and fruits of various kinds.

Golden white-eye, Cleptornis marchei  (Northern Mariana Islands) (ENM) 
Warbling white-eye, Zosterops japonicus (I) 
Bridled white-eye, Zosterops conspicullatus (Northern Mariana Islands; Extirpated from Guam) (ENM) 
Rota white-eye, Zosterops rotensis (Northern Mariana Islands) (ENM)

Laughingthrushes
Order: PasseriformesFamily: Leiothrichidae

The laughingthrushes are a large family of Old World passerine birds. They are rather diverse in size and coloration, but are characterized by soft fluffy plumage. These birds have strong legs and many are quite terrestrial. This group is not strongly migratory and most species have short rounded wings and a weak flight.

Greater necklaced laughingthrush, Garrulax pectoralis (I) 
Hwamei, Garrulax canorus (I) 
Red-billed leiothrix, Leiothrix lutea (I)

Kinglets

Order: PasseriformesFamily: Regulidae

The kinglets and "crests" are a small family of birds which resemble some warblers. They are very small insectivorous birds in the single genus Regulus. The adults have colored crowns, giving rise to their name.

Ruby-crowned kinglet, Corthylio calendula 
Golden-crowned kinglet, Regulus satrapa

Waxwings

Order: PasseriformesFamily: Bombycillidae

The waxwings are a group of passerine birds with soft silky plumage and unique red tips to some of the wing feathers. In the Bohemian and cedar waxwings, these tips look like sealing wax and give the group its name. These are arboreal birds of northern forests. They live on insects in summer and berries in winter.

Bohemian waxwing, Bombycilla garrulus 
Cedar waxwing, Bombycilla cedrorum

Silky-flycatchers

Order: PasseriformesFamily: Ptiliogonatidae

The silky-flycatchers are a small family of passerine birds which occur mainly in Central America. They are related to waxwings and most species have small crests.

Gray silky-flycatcher, Ptiliogonys cinereus (A) 
Phainopepla, Phainopepla nitens

Hawaiian honeyeaters

Order: PasseriformesFamily: Mohoidae

Hawaiian honeyeaters prefer to flit quickly from perch to perch in the outer foliage, stretching up or sideways or hanging upside down at need. They have a highly developed brush-tipped tongue, which is frayed and fringed with bristles which soak up liquids readily. The tongue is flicked rapidly and repeatedly into a flower, the upper mandible then compressing any liquid out when the bill is closed. All species of honeyeaters below were endemic to Hawaii, but are now extinct. The Kauai oo was the last species to survive, and was last seen in 1987.

Kauai oo, Moho braccatus (EH) 
Oahu oo, Moho apicalus (EH) 
Bishop's oo, Moho bishopi (EH) 
Hawaii oo, Moho nobilis (EH) 
Kioea, Chaetoptila angustipluma (EH)

Nuthatches

Order: PasseriformesFamily: Sittidae

Nuthatches are small woodland birds. They have the unusual ability to climb down trees head first, unlike other birds which can only go upwards. Nuthatches have big heads, short tails, and powerful bills and feet.

Red-breasted nuthatch, Sitta canadensis 
White-breasted nuthatch, Sitta carolinensis 
Pygmy nuthatch, Sitta pygmaea 
Brown-headed nuthatch, Sitta pusilla (EM)

Treecreepers

Order: PasseriformesFamily: Certhiidae

Treecreepers are small woodland birds, brown above and white below. They have thin pointed down-curved bills, which they use to extricate insects from bark. They have stiff tail feathers, like woodpeckers, which they use to support themselves on vertical trees.

Brown creeper, Certhia americana

Gnatcatchers

Order: PasseriformesFamily: Polioptilidae

These dainty birds resemble Old World warblers in their structure and habits, moving restlessly through the foliage seeking insects. The gnatcatchers are mainly soft bluish gray in color and have the typical insectivore's long sharp bill. Many species have distinctive black head patterns (especially males) and long, regularly cocked, black-and-white tails.

Blue-gray gnatcatcher, Polioptila caerulea 
Black-tailed gnatcatcher, Polioptila melanura 
California gnatcatcher, Polioptila californica 
Black-capped gnatcatcher, Polioptila nigriceps

Wrens

Order: PasseriformesFamily: Troglodytidae

Wrens are small and inconspicuous birds, except for their loud songs. They have short wings and thin down-turned bills. Several species often hold their tails upright. All are insectivorous.

Rock wren, Salpinctes obsoletus 
Canyon wren, Catherpes mexicanus 
House wren, Troglodytes aedon 
Pacific wren, Troglodytes pacificus 
Winter wren, Troglodytes hiemalis 
Sedge wren, Cistothorus platensis 
Marsh wren, Cistothorus palustris 
Carolina wren, Thryothorus ludovicianus 
Bewick's wren, Thryomanes bewickii 
Cactus wren, Campylorhynchus brunneicapillus 
Sinaloa wren, Thryothorus sinaloa (A)

Mockingbirds and thrashers

Order: PasseriformesFamily: Mimidae

The mimids are a family of passerine birds which includes thrashers, mockingbirds, tremblers, and the New World catbirds. These birds are notable for their vocalization, especially their remarkable ability to mimic a wide variety of birds and other sounds heard outdoors. The species tend towards dull grays and browns in their appearance.

Blue mockingbird, Melanotis caerulescens (A) 
Gray catbird, Dumetella carolinensis 
Pearly-eyed thrasher, Margarops fuscatus (Puerto Rico) 
Curve-billed thrasher, Toxostoma curvirostre 
Brown thrasher, Toxostoma rufum 
Long-billed thrasher, Toxostoma longirostre 
Bendire's thrasher, Toxostoma bendirei 
California thrasher, Toxostoma redivivum 
LeConte's thrasher, Toxostoma lecontei 
Crissal thrasher, Toxostoma crissale 
Sage thrasher, Oreoscoptes montanus 
Bahama mockingbird, Mimus gundlachii (C) 
Northern mockingbird, Mimus polyglottos

Starlings

Order: PasseriformesFamily: Sturnidae

Starlings and mynas are small to medium-sized Old World passerine birds with strong feet. Their flight is strong and direct and most are very gregarious. Their preferred habitat is fairly open country, and they eat insects and fruit. The plumage of several species is dark with a metallic sheen.

Micronesian starling, Aplonis opaca (Guam, Northern Mariana Islands) (ENM / EG) 
Polynesian starling, Aplonis tabuensis (American Samoa) 
Samoan starling, Alponis atrifusca (American Samoa) 
European starling, Sturnus vulgaris (I) 
White-cheeked starling, Spodiopsar cineraceus (Northern Mariana Islands) (A) 
Common myna, Acridotheres tristis (I) 
Jungle myna, Acridotheres fuscus (American Samoa) (I)

Dippers

Order: PasseriformesFamily: Cinclidae

Dippers are a group of perching birds whose habitat includes aquatic environments in the Americas, Europe, and Asia. They are named for their bobbing or dipping movements. These birds have adaptations which allows them to submerge and walk on the bottom to feed on insect larvae.

American dipper, Cinclus mexicanus

Thrushes and allies

Order: PasseriformesFamily: Turdidae

The thrushes are a group of passerine birds that occur mainly but not exclusively in the Old World. They are plump, soft plumaged, small to medium-sized insectivores or sometimes omnivores, often feeding on the ground. Many have attractive songs.

Eastern bluebird, Sialia sialis 
Western bluebird, Sialia mexicana 
Mountain bluebird, Sialia currucoides 
Townsend's solitaire, Myadestes townsendi 
Brown-backed solitaire, Myadestes occidentalis (A) 
Kamao, Myadestes myadestinus (EH) 
Amaui, Myadestes woahensis (EH) 
Olomao, Myadestes lanaiensis (EH) 
Omao, Myadestes obscurus (EH) 
Puaiohi, Myadestes palmeri (EH) 
Orange-billed nightingale-thrush, Catharus aurantiirostris (A) 
Black-headed nightingale-thrush, Catharus mexicanus (A) 
Veery, Catharus fuscescens 
Gray-cheeked thrush, Catharus minimus 
Bicknell's thrush, Catharus bicknelli 
Swainson's thrush, Catharus ustulatus 
Hermit thrush, Catharus guttatus 
Wood thrush, Hylocichla mustelina 
Eurasian blackbird, Turdus merula (A) 
Eyebrowed thrush, Turdus obscurus 
Island thrush, Turdus poliocephalus (American Samoa) 
Dusky thrush, Turdus eunomus (C) 
Naumann's thrush, Turdus naumanni (A) 
Fieldfare, Turdus pilaris (C) 
Redwing, Turdus iliacus (C) 
Song thrush, Turdus philomelos (A) 
Clay-colored thrush, Turdus grayi 
White-throated thrush, Turdus assimilis (C) 
Rufous-backed robin, Turdus rufopalliatus 
American robin, Turdus migratorius 
Red-legged thrush, Turdus plumbeus (A) 
Varied thrush, Ixoreus naevius 
Aztec thrush, Ridgwayia pinicola (C)

Old World flycatchers
Order: PasseriformesFamily: Muscicapidae

The Old World flycatchers form a large family of small passerine birds. These are mainly small arboreal insectivores, many of which, as the name implies, take their prey on the wing.

Gray-streaked flycatcher, Muscicapa griseisticta (C) 
Asian brown flycatcher, Muscicapa dauurica (A) 
Spotted flycatcher, Muscicapa striata (A) 
Dark-sided flycatcher, Muscicapa sibirica (C) 
White-rumped shama, Copsychus malabaricus (I) 
European robin, Erithacus rubecula (A) 
Siberian blue robin, Larvivora cyane (A) 
Rufous-tailed robin, Larvivora sibilans (A) 
Bluethroat, Cyanecula svecica 
Siberian rubythroat, Calliope calliope 
Red-flanked bluetail, Tarsiger cyanurus (C) 
Narcissus flycatcher, Ficedula narcissina (A) 
Mugimaki flycatcher, Ficedula mugimaki (A) 
Taiga flycatcher, Ficedula albicilla (C) 
Common redstart, Phoenicurus phoenicurus (A) 
Asian stonechat, Saxicola maurus (C) 
Northern wheatear, Oenanthe oenanthe 
Pied wheatear, Oenanthe pleschanka (A)

Olive warbler
Order: PasseriformesFamily: Peucedramidae

The olive warbler has a gray body with some olive-green on the wings and two white wing bars. The male's head and breast are orange and there is a black patch through the eye. This is the only species in its family.

Olive warbler, Peucedramus taeniatus

Weavers and allies
Order: PasseriformesFamily: Ploceidae

Weavers are a group of small passerine birds related to the finches. These are seed-eating birds with rounded conical bills, most of which breed in sub-Saharan Africa, with fewer species in tropical Asia. Weavers get their name from the large woven nests many species make. They are gregarious birds which often breed colonially.

Northern red bishop, Euplectes franciscanus (Puerto Rico, U.S. Virgin Islands) (I)  
Yellow-crowned bishop, Euplectes afer (Puerto Rico) (I)

Indigobirds
Order:PasseriformesFamily: Viduidae

The Viduidae is a family of small passerine birds native to Africa that includes indigobirds and whydahs. All species are brood parasites which lay their eggs in the nests of estrildid finches. Species usually have black or indigo predominating in their plumage.

Pin-tailed whydah, Vidua macroura (Puerto Rico) (I)

Waxbills and allies
Order: PasseriformesFamily: Estrildidae

The members of this family are small passerine birds native to the Old World tropics. They are gregarious and often colonial seed eaters with short thick but pointed bills. They are all similar in structure and habits, but have wide variation in plumage colors and patterns.

Bronze mannikin, Spermestes cucullata (Puerto Rico, U.S. Virgin Islands) (I) 
African silverbill, Euodice cantans (I) 
Indian silverbill, Euodice malabarica (I) 
Java sparrow, Padda oryzivora (I) 
Scaly-breasted munia, Lonchura punctulata (I) 
Tricolored munia, Lonchura malacca (I) 
Chestnut munia, Lonchura atricapilla (Guam, Puerto Rico) (I) 
Red avadavat, Amandava amandava (I) 
Lavender waxbill, Glaucestrilda caerulescens (I) 
Common waxbill, Estrilda astrild (I)

Accentors
Order: PasseriformesFamily: Prunellidae

Accentors are small, fairly drab species superficially similar, but unrelated to, sparrows. However, accentors have thin sharp bills, reflecting their diet of insects in summer, augmented with seeds and berries in winter.

Siberian accentor, Prunella montanella (C)

Old World sparrows

Order: PasseriformesFamily: Passeridae

Old World sparrows are small passerine birds. In general, sparrows tend to be small plump brownish or grayish birds with short tails and short powerful beaks. Sparrows are seed eaters, but they also consume small insects.

House sparrow, Passer domesticus (I) 
Eurasian tree sparrow, Passer montanus (I)

Wagtails and pipits

Order: PasseriformesFamily: Motacillidae

Motacillidae is a family of small passerine birds with medium to long tails. They include the wagtails, longclaws, and pipits. They are slender ground-feeding insectivores of open country.

Western yellow wagtail, Motacilla flava (Northern Mariana Islands) (A) 
Eastern yellow wagtail, Motacilla tschutschensis 
Citrine wagtail, Motacilla citreola (A) 
Gray wagtail, Motacilla cinerea (C) 
White wagtail, Motacilla alba 
Tree pipit, Anthus trivialis (A) 
Olive-backed pipit, Anthus hodgsoni 
Pechora pipit, Anthus gustavi (C) 
Red-throated pipit, Anthus cervinus 
American pipit, Anthus rubescens 
Sprague's pipit, Anthus spragueii

Finches, euphonias, and allies

Order: PasseriformesFamily: Fringillidae

Finches are seed-eating passerine birds that are small to moderately large and have a strong beak, usually conical and in some species very large. All have twelve tail feathers and nine primaries. These birds have a bouncing flight with alternating bouts of flapping and gliding on closed wings, and most sing well.

Common chaffinch, Fringilla coelebs (C) 
Brambling, Fringilla montifringilla 
Antillean euphonia, Chlorophonia musica (Puerto Rico) 
Evening grosbeak, Coccothraustes vespertinus 
Hawfinch, Coccothraustes coccothraustes (C) 
Common rosefinch, Carpodacus erythrinus (C) 
Pallas's rosefinch, Carpodacus roseus (A) 
Poo-uli, Melamprosops phaeosoma (EH) 
Akikiki, Oreomystis bairdi (EH) 
Oahu alauahio, Paroreomyza maculata (EH) 
Kakawahie, Paroreomyza flammea (EH) 
Maui alauahio, Paroreomyza montana (EH) 
Palila, Loxiodes balleui (EH) 
Laysan finch, Telespiza cantans (EH) 
Nihoa finch, Telespiza ultima (EH) 
Kona grosbeak, Chloridops kona (EH) 
Lesser koa-finch, Rhodacanthis flaviceps (EH) 
Greater koa-finch, Rhodacanthis palmeri (EH) 
Ula-ai-hawane, Ciridops anna (EH) 
Akohekohe, Palmeria dolei (EH) 
Laysan honeycreeper, Himatione fraithii (EH) 
Apapane, Himatione sanguinea (EH) 
Iiwi, Drepanis coccinea (EH) 
Hawaii mamo, Drepanis pacifica (EH) 
Black mamo, Drepanis funerea (EH) 
Ou, Psittirostra psittacea (EH) 
Lanai hookbill, Dysmorodropanis munroi (EH) 
Maui parrotbill, Pseudonestor xanthrophrys (EH) 
Kauai nukupuu, Hemignathus hanapepe (EH) 
Oahu nukupuu, Hemignathus lucidus (EH) 
Maui nukupuu, Hemignathus affinis (EH) 
Akiapolaau, Hemignathus wilsoni (EH) 
Lesser akialoa, Akialoa obscura (EH) 
Kauai akialoa, Akialoa stejnegeri (EH) 
Oahu akialoa, Akialoa ellisiana (EH) 
Maui-nui akialoa, Akialoa lanaiensis (EH) 
Anianiau, Magumma parva (EH) 
Hawaii amakihi, Chlorodrepanis virens (EH) 
Oahu amakihi, Chlorodrepanis flavus (EH) 
Kauai amakihi, Chlorodrepanis stejnegeri (EH) 
Greater amakihi, Viridonia sagittirostris (EH) 
Hawaii creeper, Loxops mana (EH) 
Akekee, Loxops caeruleirostris (EH) 
Oahu akepa, Loxops wolstenholmei (EH) 
Maui akepa, Loxops ochraceus (EH) 
Hawaii akepa, Loxops coccineus (EH) 
Pine grosbeak, Pinicola enucleator 
Eurasian bullfinch, Pyrrhula pyrrhula (C) 
Asian rosy-finch, Leucosticte arctoa (A) 
Gray-crowned rosy finch, Leucosticte tephrocotis 
Black rosy-finch, Leucosticte atrata (EM) 
Brown-capped rosy-finch, Leucosticte australis (EM) 
House finch, Haemorhous mexicanus  
Purple finch, Haemorhous purpureus 
Cassin's finch, Haemorhous cassinii '
Oriental greenfinch, Chloris sinica (C) 
Yellow-fronted canary, Crithagra mozambica (I) 
Common redpoll, Acanthis flammea 
Hoary redpoll, Acanthis hornemanni (Not yet assessed by the IUCN)
Red crossbill, Loxia curvirostra 
Cassia crossbill, Loxia sinesciuris (Not yet assessed by the IUCN)
White-winged crossbill, Loxia leucoptera 
Eurasian siskin, Spinus spinus (A) 
Pine siskin, Spinus pinus 
Lesser goldfinch, Spinus psaltria 
Lawrence's goldfinch, Spinus lawrencei 
American goldfinch, Spinus tristis 
Island canary, Serinus canaria (I) 
Red siskin, Spinus cucullata (Puerto Rico) (I)

Longspurs and snow buntings
Order: PasseriformesFamily: Calcariidae

The Calcariidae are a group of passerine birds that had been traditionally grouped with the New World sparrows, but differ in a number of respects and are usually found in open grassy areas.

Lapland longspur, Calcarius lapponicus 
Chestnut-collared longspur, Calcarius ornatus 
Smith's longspur, Calcarius pictus 
Thick-billed longspur, Rhynchophanes mccownii 
Snow bunting, Plectrophenax nivalis 
McKay's bunting, Plectrophenax hyperboreus (EM)

Old World buntings
Order: PasseriformesFamily: Emberizidae

Emberizidae is a family of passerine birds containing a single genus. Until 2017, the New World sparrows (Passerellidae) were also considered part of this family.

Pine bunting, Emberiza leucocephalos (A) 
Yellow-browed bunting, Emberiza chrysophrys (A) 
Little bunting, Emberiza pusilla (C) 
Rustic bunting, Emberiza rustica (A) 
Yellow-throated bunting, Emberiza elegans (A) 
Yellow-breasted bunting, Emberiza aureola (A) 
Gray bunting, Emberiza variabilis (A) 
Pallas's bunting, Emberiza pallasi (A) 
Reed bunting, Emberiza schoeniclus (C)

New World sparrows

Order: PasseriformesFamily: Passerellidae

Until 2017, these species were considered part of the family Emberizidae. Most of the species are known as sparrows, but these birds are not closely related to the Old World sparrows which are in the family Passeridae. Many of these have distinctive head patterns.

Rufous-winged sparrow, Peucaea carpalis 
Botteri's sparrow, Peucaea botterii 
Cassin's sparrow, Peucaea cassinii 
Bachman's sparrow, Peucaea aestivalis (EM) 
Grasshopper sparrow, Ammodramus savannarum 
Olive sparrow, Arremonops rufivirgatus 
Five-striped sparrow, Amphispizopsis quinquestriata 
Black-throated sparrow, Amphispiza bilineata 
Lark sparrow, Chondestes grammacus 
Lark bunting, Calamospiza melanocorys 
Chipping sparrow, Spizella passerina 
Clay-colored sparrow, Spizella pallida 
Black-chinned sparrow, Spizella atrogularis 
Field sparrow, Spizella pusilla 
Brewer's sparrow, Spizella breweri 
Worthen's sparrow, Spizella wortheni (A) 
Fox sparrow, Passerella iliaca 
American tree sparrow, Spizelloides arborea 
Dark-eyed junco, Junco hyemalis 
Yellow-eyed junco, Junco phaeonotus 
White-crowned sparrow, Zonotrichia leucophrys 
Golden-crowned sparrow, Zonotrichia atricapilla 
Harris's sparrow, Zonotrichia querula 
White-throated sparrow, Zonotrichia albicollis 
Sagebrush sparrow, Artemisiospiza nevadensis 
Bell's sparrow, Artemisiospiza belli 
Vesper sparrow, Pooecetes gramineus 
LeConte's sparrow, Ammospiza leconteii 
Seaside sparrow, Ammospiza maritima (EM) 
Nelson's sparrow, Ammospiza nelsoni 
Saltmarsh sparrow, Ammospiza caudacuta (EM) 
Baird's sparrow, Centronyx bairdii 
Henslow's sparrow, Centronyx henslowii 
Savannah sparrow, Passerculus sandwichensis 
Song sparrow, Melospiza melodia 
Lincoln's sparrow, Melospiza lincolnii 
Swamp sparrow, Melospiza georgiana 
Canyon towhee, Melozone fuscus 
Abert's towhee, Melozone aberti 
California towhee, Melozone crissalis 
Rufous-crowned sparrow, Aimophila ruficeps 
Green-tailed towhee, Pipilo chlorurus 
Spotted towhee, Pipilo maculatus 
Eastern towhee, Pipilo erythrophthalmus

Puerto Rican tanager
Order:PasseriformesFamily: Nesospingidae

This species was formerly classified as a tanager (family Thraupidae) but was placed in its own family in 2017.

Puerto Rican tanager, Nesospingus speculiferus (Puerto Rico) (EP)

Spindalises
Order: PasseriformesFamily: Spindalidae

The members of this small family are native to the Greater Antilles. One species occurs fairly frequently in Florida.

Western spindalis, Spindalis zena 
Puerto Rican spindalis, Spindalis portoricensis (Puerto Rico) (EP)

Yellow-breasted chat

Order: PasseriformesFamily: Icteriidae

This species was historically placed in the wood-warblers (Parulidae) but nonetheless most authorities were unsure if it belonged there. It was placed in its own family in 2017.

Yellow-breasted chat, Icteria virens

Troupials and allies

Order: PasseriformesFamily: Icteridae

The icterids are a group of small to medium-sized, often colorful passerine birds restricted to the New World and include the grackles, New World blackbirds, and New World orioles. Most species have black as a predominant plumage color which is often enlivened by yellow, orange, or red.

Yellow-headed blackbird, Xanthocephalus xanthocephalus 
Bobolink, Dolichonyx oryzivorus 
Chihuahuan meadowlark, Sturnella lilianae
Eastern meadowlark, Sturnella magna 
Western meadowlark, Sturnella neglecta 
Puerto Rican oriole, Icterus portonicensis (Puerto Rico) (EP) 
Black-vented oriole, Icterus wagleri (A) 
Orchard oriole, Icterus spurius 
Hooded oriole, Icterus cucullatus 
Venezuelan troupial, Icterus icterus (I) (Puerto Rico, U.S. Virgin Islands) (I)  
Streak-backed oriole, Icterus pustulatus (C) 
Bullock's oriole, Icterus bullockii 
Spot-breasted oriole, Icterus pectoralis (I) 
Altamira oriole, Icterus gularis 
Audubon's oriole, Icterus graduacauda 
Baltimore oriole, Icterus galbula 
Black-backed oriole, Icterus abeillei (A) 
Scott's oriole, Icterus parisorum 
Red-winged blackbird, Agelaius phoeniceus 
Tricolored blackbird, Agelaius tricolor 
Tawny-shouldered blackbird, Agelaius humeralis (A) 
Yellow-shouldered blackbird, Agelaius xanthomus (Puerto Rico) (EP) 
Shiny cowbird, Molothrus bonariensis 
Bronzed cowbird, Molothrus aeneus 
Brown-headed cowbird, Molothrus ater 
Rusty blackbird, Euphagus carolinus 
Brewer's blackbird, Euphagus cyanocephalus 
Common grackle, Quiscalus quiscula 
Boat-tailed grackle, Quiscalus major (EM) 
Great-tailed grackle, Quiscalus mexicanus (A) 
Greater Antillean grackle, Quiscalus niger (Puerto Rico, U.S. Virgin Islands)

New World warblers

Order: PasseriformesFamily: Parulidae

The wood-warblers are a group of small often colorful passerine birds restricted to the New World. Most are arboreal, but some are more terrestrial. Most members of this family are insectivores.

Ovenbird, Seiurus aurocapilla 
Worm-eating warbler, Helmitheros vermivorum 
Louisiana waterthrush, Parkesia motacilla 
Northern waterthrush, Parkesia noveboracensis 
Bachman's warbler, Vermivora bachmanii 
Golden-winged warbler, Vermivora chrysoptera 
Blue-winged warbler, Vermivora cyanoptera 
Black-and-white warbler, Mniotilta varia 
Prothonotary warbler, Protonotaria citrea 
Swainson's warbler, Limnothlypis swainsonii 
Crescent-chested warbler, Oreothlypis superciliosa (C) 
Tennessee warbler, Leiothlypis peregrina 
Orange-crowned warbler, Leiothlypis celata 
Colima warbler, Leiothlypis crissalis 
Lucy's warbler, Leiothlypis luciae 
Nashville warbler, Leiothlypis ruficapilla 
Virginia's warbler, Leiothlypis virginiae 
Connecticut warbler, Oporornis agilis 
Gray-crowned yellowthroat, Geothlypis poliocephala (C) 
MacGillivray's warbler, Geothlypis tolmiei 
Mourning warbler, Geothlypis philadelphia 
Kentucky warbler, Geothlypis formosa 
Common yellowthroat, Geothlypis trichas 
Elfin-woods warbler, Setophaga angelae (Puerto Rico) (EP) 
Hooded warbler, Setophaga citrina 
American redstart, Setophaga ruticilla 
Kirtland's warbler, Setophaga kirtlandii 
Cape May warbler, Setophaga tigrina 
Cerulean warbler, Setophaga cerulea 
Northern parula, Setophaga americana 
Tropical parula, Setophaga pitiayumi 
Magnolia warbler, Setophaga magnolia 
Bay-breasted warbler, Setophaga castanea 
Blackburnian warbler, Setophaga fusca 
Yellow warbler, Setophaga aestiva 
Chestnut-sided warbler, Setophaga pensylvanica 
Blackpoll warbler, Setophaga striata 
Black-throated blue warbler, Setophaga caerulescens 
Palm warbler, Setophaga palmarum 
Pine warbler, Setophaga pinus 
Yellow-rumped warbler, Setophaga coronata 
Yellow-throated warbler, Setophaga dominica 
Prairie warbler, Setophaga discolor 
Adelaide's warbler, Setophaga adelaidae (Puerto Rico, U.S. Virgin Islands) (EP) 
Grace's warbler, Setophaga graciae 
Black-throated grey warbler, Setophaga nigrescens 
Townsend's warbler, Setophaga townsendi 
Hermit warbler, Setophaga occidentalis 
Golden-cheeked warbler, Setophaga chrysoparia 
Black-throated green warbler, Setophaga virens 
Fan-tailed warbler, Basileuterus lachrymosus (C) 
Rufous-capped warbler, Basileuterus rufifrons 
Golden-crowned warbler, Basileuterus culicivorus (C) 
Canada warbler, Cardellina canadensis 
Wilson's warbler, Cardellina pusilla 
Red-faced warbler, Cardellina rubrifrons 
Painted redstart, Myioborus pictus 
Slate-throated redstart, Myioborus miniatus (C)

Cardinals and allies

Order: PasseriformesFamily: Cardinalidae

The cardinals are a family of robust seed-eating birds with strong bills. They are typically associated with open woodland. The sexes usually have distinct plumages.

Hepatic tanager, Piranga flava 
Summer tanager, Piranga rubra 
Scarlet tanager, Piranga olivacea 
Western tanager, Piranga ludoviciana 
Flame-colored tanager, Piranga bidentata 
Crimson-collared grosbeak, Rhodothraupis celaeno (C) 
Northern cardinal, Cardinalis cardinalis 
Pyrrhuloxia, Cardinalis sinuatus 
Yellow grosbeak, Pheucticus chrysopeplus (C) 
Rose-breasted grosbeak, Pheucticus ludovicianus 
Black-headed grosbeak, Pheucticus melanocephalus 
Blue bunting, Cyanocompsa parellina (C) 
Blue grosbeak, Passerina caerulea 
Lazuli bunting, Passerina amoena 
Indigo bunting, Passerina cyanea 
Varied bunting, Passerina versicolor 
Painted bunting, Passerina ciris 
Dickcissel, Spiza americana

Tanagers and allies
Order: PasseriformesFamily: Thraupidae

The tanagers are a large group of small to medium-sized passerine birds restricted to the New World, mainly in the tropics. Many species are brightly colored. As a family they are omnivorous, but individual species specialize in eating fruits, seeds, insects, or other types of food.

Red-crested cardinal, Paroaria coronata (I) 
Yellow-billed cardinal, Paroaria capitata (I) 
Saffron finch, Sicalis flaveola (I) 
Red-legged honeycreeper, Cyanerpes cyaneus (A) 
Bananaquit, Coereba flaveola (C) 
Yellow-faced grassquit, Tiaris olivaceus (C) 
Puerto Rican bullfinch, Melopyrrha portoricensis (Puerto Rico) (EP) 
Lesser Antillean bullfinch, Loxigilla noctis (U.S. Virgin Islands) 
Black-faced grassquit, Melanospiza bicolor (C) 
Morelet's seedeater, Sporophila morelleti (Not yet assessed by the IUCN)

Notes

References

See also
List of birds
Lists of birds by region
List of endemic birds of Hawaii
Fauna of the United States

External links
Birds of the USA - World Institute for Conservation and Environment

 United States
United States